= Listed buildings in Sheffield S3 =

The S3 district lies within the City of Sheffield, South Yorkshire, England. The district contains 101 listed buildings that are recorded in the National Heritage List for England. Of these, seven are listed at Grade II*, the middle grade, and the others are at Grade II, the lowest grade. The district is lies north and west of central Sheffield, and includes the areas of Broomhall, Burngreave, Kelham Island, Neepsend, Netherthorpe, and the markets area of Sheffield City Centre.

For neighbouring areas, see listed buildings in Sheffield City Centre, listed buildings in S4, listed buildings in S5, listed buildings in S6 and listed buildings in S10.

== Key ==
Grade	Criteria
II*	Particularly important buildings of more than special interest
II	Buildings of national importance and special interest

== Buildings ==
Name and location	Street	Photograph	Date	Notes	Grade
Lady's Bridge; 53.38555°N 1.46427°W	Lady's Bridge		1485		II
Farfield Inn; 53.39588°N 1.48595°W	Neepsend Lane		1753		II
John Watts Cutlery Works; 53.38594°N 1.47179°W	Lambert Street		Late 18th century		II
117 and 119 West Bar; 53.38577°N 1.47093°W	West Bar		1794		II
Kelham Weir; 53.39027°N 1.47519°W	N/A		About 1800		II
Old Town Hall; 53.38449°N 1.46468°W	Waingate		1808	Designed by Charles Watson	II
5 Conway Street; 53.37864°N 1.48339°W	Conway Street		About 1820		II
100 & 102 Gell Street; 53.37843°N 1.48341°W	Gell Street		About 1820		II
15 Regent Terrace; 53.38054°N 1.48149°W	Regent Terrace		About 1820		II
Cornish Place East Range; 53.39031°N 1.47647°W	Cornish Street		1822		II*
Cornish Place West Range; 53.39063°N 1.47713°W	Cornish Street		1822		II*
Ebenezer Chapel; 53.38843°N 1.47392°W	South Parade		1823		II
Christ Church Vicarage; 53.39756°N 1.46793°W	Pitsmoor Road		Early 19th century		II
Globe Works; 53.38984°N 1.47799°W	Penistone Road		1825	Designed by Henry and William Ibbotson	II*
Kashmir House; 53.39730°N 1.46840°W	Pitsmoor Road		About 1825		II
The Milestone; 53.38968°N 1.47654°W	Green Lane		Early 19th century		II
259 Pitsmoor Road; 53.39773°N 1.46769°W	Pitsmoor Road		Early 19th century		II
249 and 251 Pitsmoor Road; 53.39702°N 1.46893°W	Pitsmoor Road		About 1825		II
Toll House; 53.40032°N 1.46531°W	Burngreave Road		Early 19th century		II
Shirecliffe House; 53.40158°N 1.46944°W	108 Shirecliffe Lane		About 1840		II
Methodist Chapel and Littlewood Memorial Hall; 53.38557°N 1.47370°W	Scotland Street		1828		II
36 & 38 Victoria Street; 53.38064°N 1.48225°W	Victoria Street		About 1830		II
105–125 Devonshire Street; 53.37937°N 1.47675°W	Devonshire Street		About 1840		II
34 Gell Street; 53.38092°N 1.48323°W	Gell Street		About 1840		II
94 Gell Street; 53.37889°N 1.48321°W	Gell Street		About 1840		II
Well Meadow Street Crucible Furnace and Workshops; 53.38541°N 1.48039°W	Well Meadow Street		About 1840		II*
Aizlewood's Mill; 53.38847°N 1.46586°W	Nursery Street		1847	Designed by William Flockton	II
Boundary Marker near Bridgehouses Tunnel; 53.38965°N 1.46401°W	N/A		About 1847		II
Bridgehouses Tunnel West Portal; 53.38958°N 1.46373°W	N/A		1847	Designed by Frederick Swanwick	II
Bardwell Road Railway Bridge; 53.39519°N 1.47829°W	Bardwell Road		About 1848	Designed by John Fowler	II
New Testament Church of God; 53.38802°N 1.46576°W	Nursery Street		1848	Designed by William Flockton	II
Wicker Arches; 53.38830°N 1.46102°W	Wicker		1848	Designed by John Fowler	II*
Brooklyn Works; 53.38996°N 1.47553°W	Green Lane		Mid 19th century		II
Christ Church, Pitsmoor; 53.39680°N 1.46738°W	Pitsmoor Road		1850	Designed by Flockton and Son	II
Cornish Works; 53.39005°N 1.47763°W	Cornish Street		Mid 19th century		II
Don Cutlery Works; 53.38744°N 1.47682°W	Doncaster Street		Mid 19th century		II
Fat Cat; 53.38857°N 1.47178°W	Alma Street		Mid 19th century		II
2 & 3 Hanover Square; 53.37579°N 1.48251°W	Hanover Square		About 1850		II
4 & 5 Hanover Square; 53.37561°N 1.48232°W	Hanover Square		About 1850		II
6 & 7 Hanover Square; 53.37545°N 1.48208°W	Hanover Square		About 1850		II
8 & 9 Hanover Square; 53.37527°N 1.48187°W	Hanover Square		About 1850		II
10–16 Hanover Square; 53.37523°N 1.48255°W	Hanover Square		About 1850		II
Kutrite Works; 53.38668°N 1.47432°W	Snow Lane		Mid 19th century		II
Old Police Station; 53.38463°N 1.46510°W	Castle Green		Mid 19th century		II
Sandbed Weir; 53.39771°N 1.48677°W	N/A		Mid 19th century		II
Taylor's Ceylon Works; 53.37651°N 1.47849°W	Thomas Street		About 1850		II
80 & 82 Upper Hanover Street; 53.37895°N 1.48446°W	Upper Hanover Street		About 1850		II
40 Victoria Street; 53.38037°N 1.48235°W	Victoria Street		About 1850		II
Wharncliffe Works; 53.38987°N 1.47712°W	Green Lane		Mid 19th century		II
Taylor's Eye Witness Works; 53.37614°N 1.47849°W	Milton Street		1852		II
Sadacca; 53.38654°N 1.46244°W	Wicker		1853		II
Rutland Road Bridge; 53.39255°N 1.47807°W	Rutland Road		1854		II
60 Malinda Street; 53.38817°N 1.47875°W	Malinda Street		About 1855		II
30 Mowbray Street; 53.39102°N 1.47282°W	Mowbray Street		1850s		II
Ball Street Bridge; 53.39036°N 1.47581°W	Ball Street		About 1856		II
Borough Bridge; 53.38898°N 1.46837°W	Corporation Street		1856		II
St Andrew; 53.37874°N 1.48458°W	Upper Hanover Street		1856	Designed by Flockton & Son	II
St Stephen; 53.38606°N 1.48559°W	Fawcett Street		1857	Designed by Flockton and Sons	II
Beehive Works; 53.37569°N 1.47935°W	Milton Street		About 1860		II*
Burngreave Cemetery North East Lodge; 53.40111°N 1.45671°W	Melrose Road		About 1860		II
Green Lane Works Gateway; 53.38941°N 1.47483°W	Green Lane		1860	Designed by Alfred Stevens	II*
Kelham Island Museum Russell Works; 53.38964°N 1.47312°W	Kelham Island		About 1860		II
Kingston Works; 53.38836°N 1.47958°W	Malinda Street		About 1860		II
54 Well Meadow Street and Crucible Furnace; 53.38573°N 1.48057°W	Well Meadow Street		About 1860		II
Burngreave Cemetery Chapels; 53.39760°N 1.46148°W	Melrose Road		1861	Designed by Flockton and Lee	II
Burngreave Cemetery Lodges, Railing and Gate Piers; 53.39689°N 1.46148°W	Melrose Road		1861	Designed by Flockton and Lee	II
Seventh Day Adventist Church; 53.39321°N 1.46382°W	Andover Street		1862	Designed by William Hill	II
Burngreave Vestry Offices; 53.39331°N 1.45845°W	Burngreave Road		1864		II
94, 96 and 100 Milton Street; 53.37544°N 1.47963°W	Milton Street		1860s		II
Bath Hotel; 53.37919°N 1.48226°W	Victoria Street		About 1868		II
William Brothers Crucible Furnace; 53.38888°N 1.47464°W	Green Lane		1868		II
St Silas; 53.37570°N 1.48305°W	Broomhall Street		1869	Designed by John Brightmore Mitchell-Withers	II
Spital Hill Works; 53.38977°N 1.46028°W	Spital Hill		About 1870		II
Netherthorpe Junior School; 53.38617°N 1.48121°W	Netherthorpe Street		1873	Designed by Innocent and Brown	II
Doncaster Street Cementation Furnace; 53.38733°N 1.47751°W	Doncaster Street		Late 19th century	Also a scheduled monument	II
Pye Bank School and Caretakers House; 53.39404°N 1.46778°W	Andover Street		1875	Designed by Innocent and Brown	II
Sewer Gas Lamp; 53.38005°N 1.47850°W	Broomhall Street		Late 19th century	At junction with Westhill Lane	II
Sewer Gas Lamp; 53.38126°N 1.48217°W	Leavy Greave Road		Late 19th century	At junction with Victoria Street	II
Springfield School; 53.37817°N 1.48098°W	Cavendish Street		1875	Designed by Innocent & Brown	II
Springfield School Wall and Railing; 53.37802°N 1.48038°W	Cavendish Street		1875	Designed by Innocent & Brown	II
Springfield School Caretaker's House; 53.37801°N 1.48101°W	Cavendish Street		About 1877	Designed by Innocent & Brown	II
Jessop Hospital for Women; 53.38131°N 1.48249°W	Leavygreave Road		1878	Designed by John Dodsley Webster	II
Bartolome House Central Block; 53.38420°N 1.48877°W	Winter Street		1882	Designed by S. L. Swann	II
Bartolome House Lodge and Walls; 53.38374°N 1.48925°W	Winter Street		1882	Designed by S. L. Swann	II
Bartolome House North West Range; 53.38396°N 1.48952°W	Winter Street		1882	Designed by S. L. Swann	II
Bartolome House South East Range; 53.38377°N 1.48895°W	Winter Street		1882	Designed by S. L. Swann	II
Church of the Nazarene; 53.38078°N 1.48239°W	Victoria Street		About 1885		II
Hillfoot Bridge; 53.39554°N 1.48662°W	Neepsend Lane		1885		II
Wharncliffe Fireclay Works; 53.37957°N 1.47852°W	Broomhall Street		1888		II
122 Wicker; 53.38786°N 1.46107°W	Wicker		1894		II
85–93 Wicker; 53.38799°N 1.46206°W	Wicker		About 1895		II
Fire and Police Museum; 53.38548°N 1.47097°W	West Bar		1900	Designed by John Norton	II
Royal Exchange Buildings and Castle House; 53.38578°N 1.46383°W	Lady's Bridge		1900	Designed by John Henry Bryars	II
Royal Victoria Buildings; 53.38582°N 1.46420°W	Lady's Bridge		1900	Designed by John Henry Bryars	II
Burngreave Cemetery War Memorial; 53.40021°N 1.45692°W	Melrose Road		About 1920	Designed by Reginald Blomfield	II
Burngreave Cemetery War Memorial Cross; 53.40019°N 1.45693°W	Melrose Road		About 1920	Designed by Reginald Blomfield	II
Insignia Works; 53.39266°N 1.47883°W	Rutland Road		1920	Designed by William John Hale	II
St Stephen's Church War Memorial; 53.38621°N 1.48581°W	Fawcett Street		1920		II
Club Mill Road Crucible Steel Furnace; 53.40175°N 1.48598°W	Club Mill Road		Early 20th century		II
K6 telephone box 53.38351°N 1.48862°W	Winter Street		Designed 1935		II
Castle House; 53.38399°N 1.46526°W	Angel Street		1964	Designed by George S. Hay	II
Moore Street electricity substation 53.37472°N 1.47858°W	Moore Street		1968	Designed by Jefferson, Sheard and Partners	II
