= City ward, Sheffield =

Electoral ward in the City of Sheffield, South Yorkshire, England

Coordinates: 53.376°N 1.481°W

City
- Shown within Sheffield
- Population: 36,412
- Metropolitan borough: City of Sheffield
- Metropolitan county: South Yorkshire
- Region: Yorkshire and the Humber
- Country: England
- Sovereign state: United Kingdom
- UK Parliament: Sheffield Central
- Councillors: Martin Phipps (Green Party); Douglas Johnson (Green Party); Ruth Mersereau (Green Party)

City ward — which includes the districts of Highfield, Kelham Island and the city centre — is one of the 28 electoral wards in City of Sheffield, England. It covers the central area of the city. The ward was created following the 2015 local government boundary review out of part of the old Central ward, which, with a population of 36,412, was the largest ward in the UK. City is one of the wards that make up the Sheffield Central constituency.

== Districts of City ward ==
=== City Centre ===
Sheffield City Centre (grid reference SK354872)—often just referred to as town—is the area within roughly 3/4 mile (1.2 km) of Sheffield Cathedral. It is encircled by the Inner Ring Road, a circular route started in the late 1960s and now completed in 2008. As well as the cathedral, notable buildings in the city centre include the Grade I listed Town Hall, the City Hall, and the Winter Garden. Several areas of the city centre have been designated as "quarters". Of these, the Devonshire Quarter and Cultural Industries Quarter are the best known.

=== Highfield ===
Highfield (grid reference SK351857) is the area immediately south of the city centre, between Sharrow to the west and Queens Road to the east. It includes Bramall Lane football stadium, home of Sheffield United F.C.

=== Kelham Island ===
Kelham Island is one of Sheffield's eleven designated quarters. Formerly an industrial area, the island itself was created by the building of a goit, or mill race, fed from the River Don to serve the water wheels powering the workshops of the areas' industrial heyday. The quarter was named after the island, however, the boundaries extend beyond the physical island created by the river and goit.

The Quarter is roughly diamond in shape, and is bordered by Shalesmoor and Gibraltar Street to the south-west; Corporation Street to the south-east; Mowbray Street, Harvest Lane and Neepsend Lane to the north-east, and Ball Street and Cornish Street to the north-west. The Cornish Place Works sit just outside this quarter, to the north-west. Green Lane and Alma Street form the main spine roads of the area. The Green Lane Works (Grade II* listed) and the Brooklyn Works (Grade II listed) are both important industrial heritage sites. A great deal of urban regeneration is evident in this area, as residential and social uses are mixed into this former industrial area.

The area is home to an industrial museum, the Kelham Island Museum, including the famous River Don Engine. The Chimney House for events and occasions and five pubs: the Kelham Island Tavern (twice CAMRA National Pub of the Year), the Fat Cat, The Wellington, the Ship Inn and The Milestone. It is also host to the Kelham Island Brewery (brewers of Pale Rider, amongst others). The Quarter housed one of Sheffield's last traditional hand-made scissor makers, Ernest Wright and Son Limited, until their relocation to premises closer to the city centre in 2011.
