= Upper Don Trail =

15-mile footpath in northern England

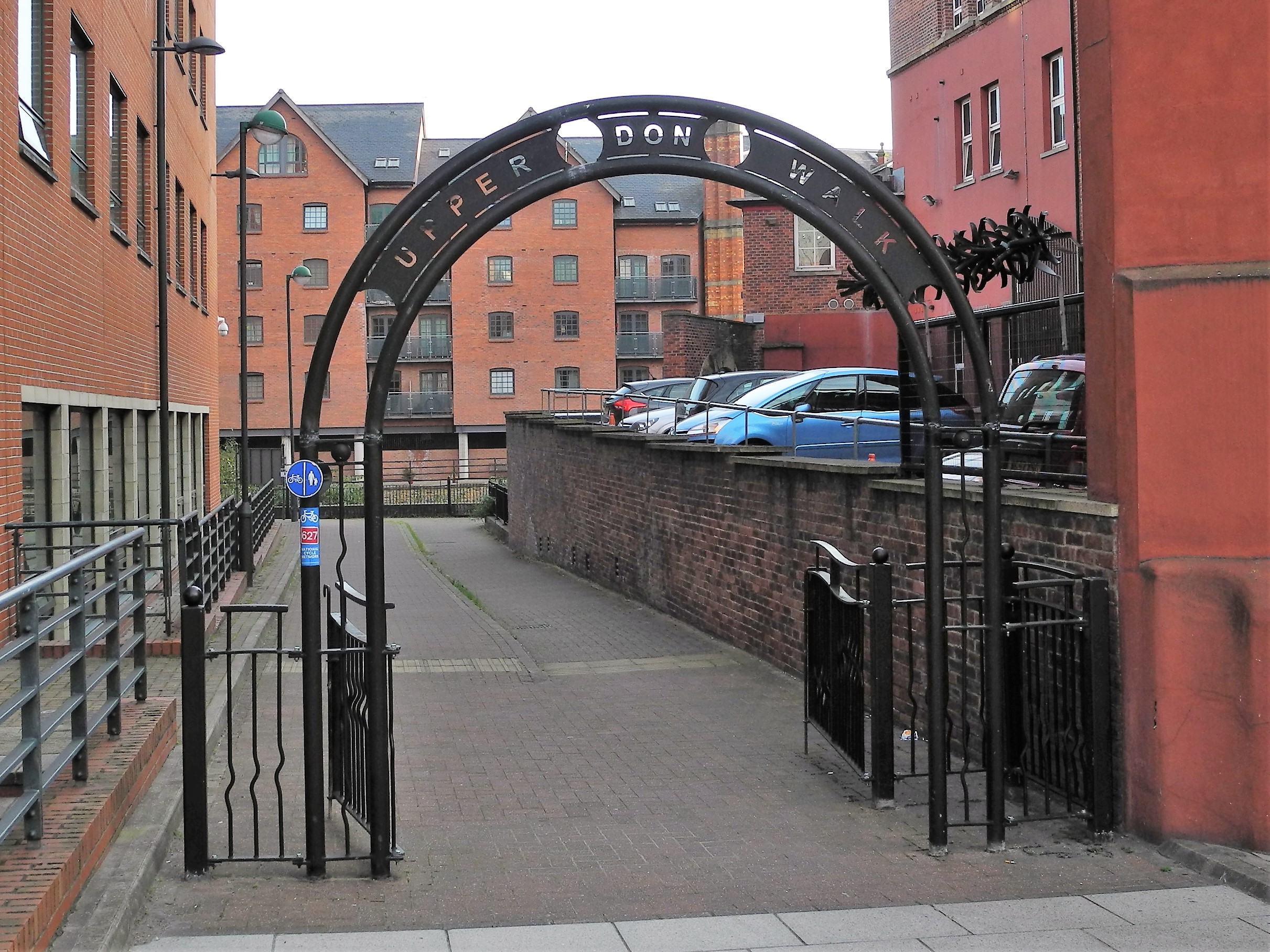
The start of the Trail at the Riverside Exchange quarter in Sheffield

The Upper Don Trail formerly known as the Upper Don Walk is a 15 mile long recreational multi use trail which links the centre of Sheffield to the village of Oughtibridge. Various sections continue along the course of the upper Don to Dunford Bridge and along the Little Don from Deepcar out towards Stocksbridge and Langsett Reservoir. It follows the course of the River Don and partially the National Cycle Network route 627. Beyond Wortley the Trail forms part of the Trans Pennine Trail. The route is variable in quality, the first mile is well defined as it has been integrated into the newly developed quarters to the immediate north of the city centre. The section through Beeley Woods between Wadsley Bridge and Oughtibridge is heavily used by walkers and cyclists. The rest of the route is a mixture of path, road and woodland walking.

== History ==
The Upper Don Walk Trust was formed in 2004 as a registered charity and was made up of interested people, organisations and planners. They are committed to creating a walk that can be used by walkers, cyclists, wheelchair users, prams, canoeists and anglers. The walk links with the Five Weirs Walk at Lady's Bridge, and the Trans Pennine Trail at Oughtibridge.

In November 2019, the Trust was renamed the Upper Don Trail Trust to emphasise the shared use aspect of the route and its ambitions extended north of Oughtibridge to Stocksbridge and the Peak District beyond.

== Route ==
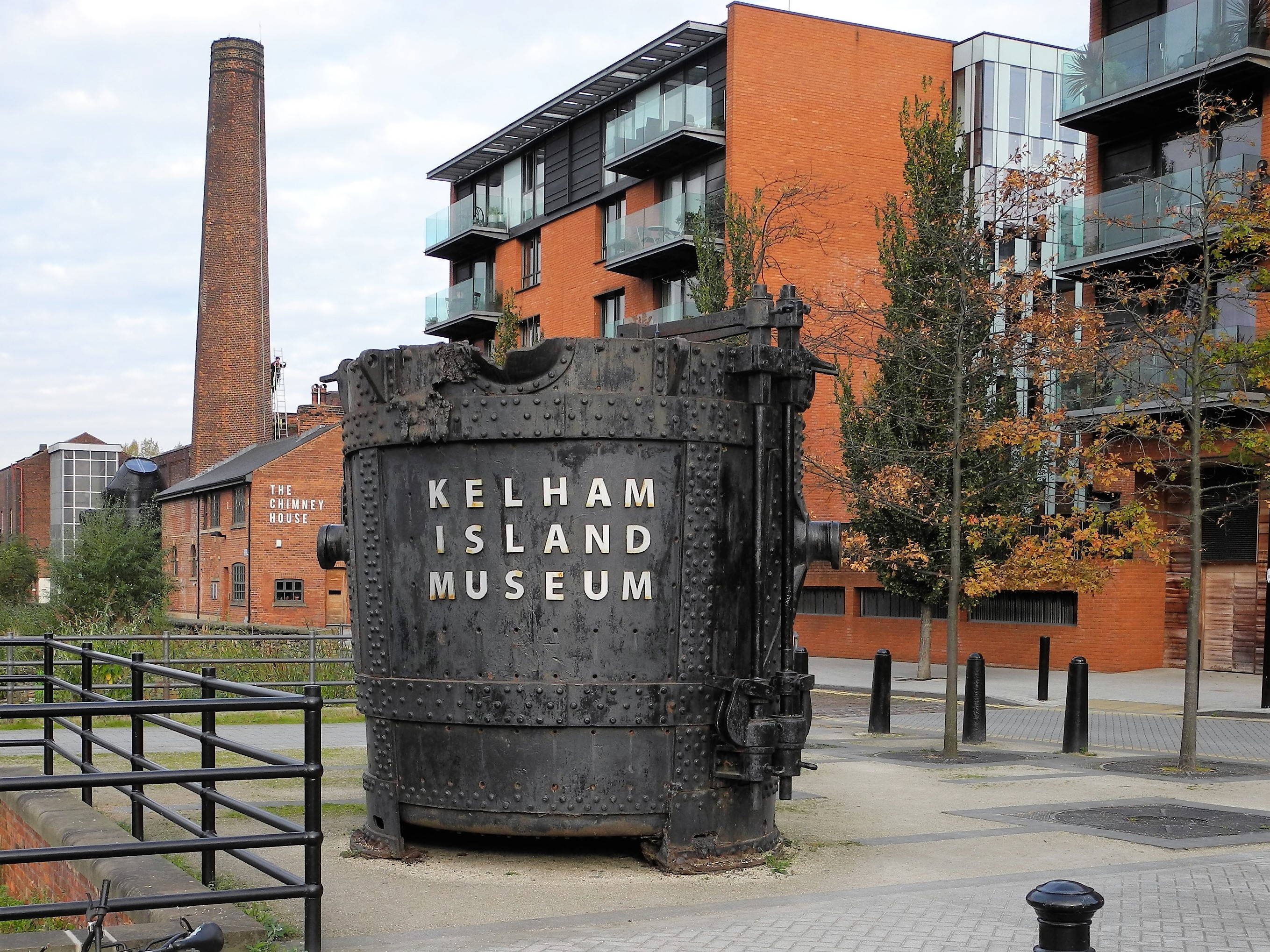
The walk passes the Kelham Island Museum

The walk starts (53°23′08″N 1°27′56″W)(//gent.film.else) in the newly developed Riverside Exchange quarter of the city, an important area of industrial heritage which was formerly known as Millsands, it was the site of the Town corn mill from the 12th century onwards and was later developed by the Vickers family as a steel making site. The walk continues on a tarmac path on the south bank of the river passing the Nursery Street footbridge and a stone rectangular column which is the memorial to the Great Sheffield Flood of 1864. The walk negotiates the Bridgehouses roundabout using pedestrian crossings and continues through the Kelham Island Quarter passing the associated industrial museum.

The original plans for the walk called for a footbridge to link Kelham Island back to the south bank of the river at the Brooklyn Works. This was to be a one tenth replica of the Brooklyn Bridge in New York City to commemorate the strong industrial links between Sheffield and Brooklyn in the 19th century. However, the floods of 2007 caused the plans for the bridge to be put on hold and even though new flood defences were installed around Kelham Island and the bridge design was modified accordingly, it was never built. Reports from 2016 now say that permission has been granted for the building of a 20 metre long bridge with a simple contemporary appearance.

The absence of the bridge forces the walk to use the public roads of Alma Street and Little Kelham Street (pedestrianised) passing the industrial heritage sites of the Green Lane Works and Cornish Place before crossing to the north bank of the Don by the Grade II listed Ball Street Bridge and going left by a riverside path to reach the suburb of Neepsend. There are no riverside paths through Neepsend and it is necessary to follow the busy Neepsend Lane for roughly 750 yards to reach Hillfoot Bridge. Club Mill Road is then followed for one and a half miles, first a quiet road through an industrial estate and then as a path passing through the disused Wardsend Cemetery to reach the suburb of Owlerton.

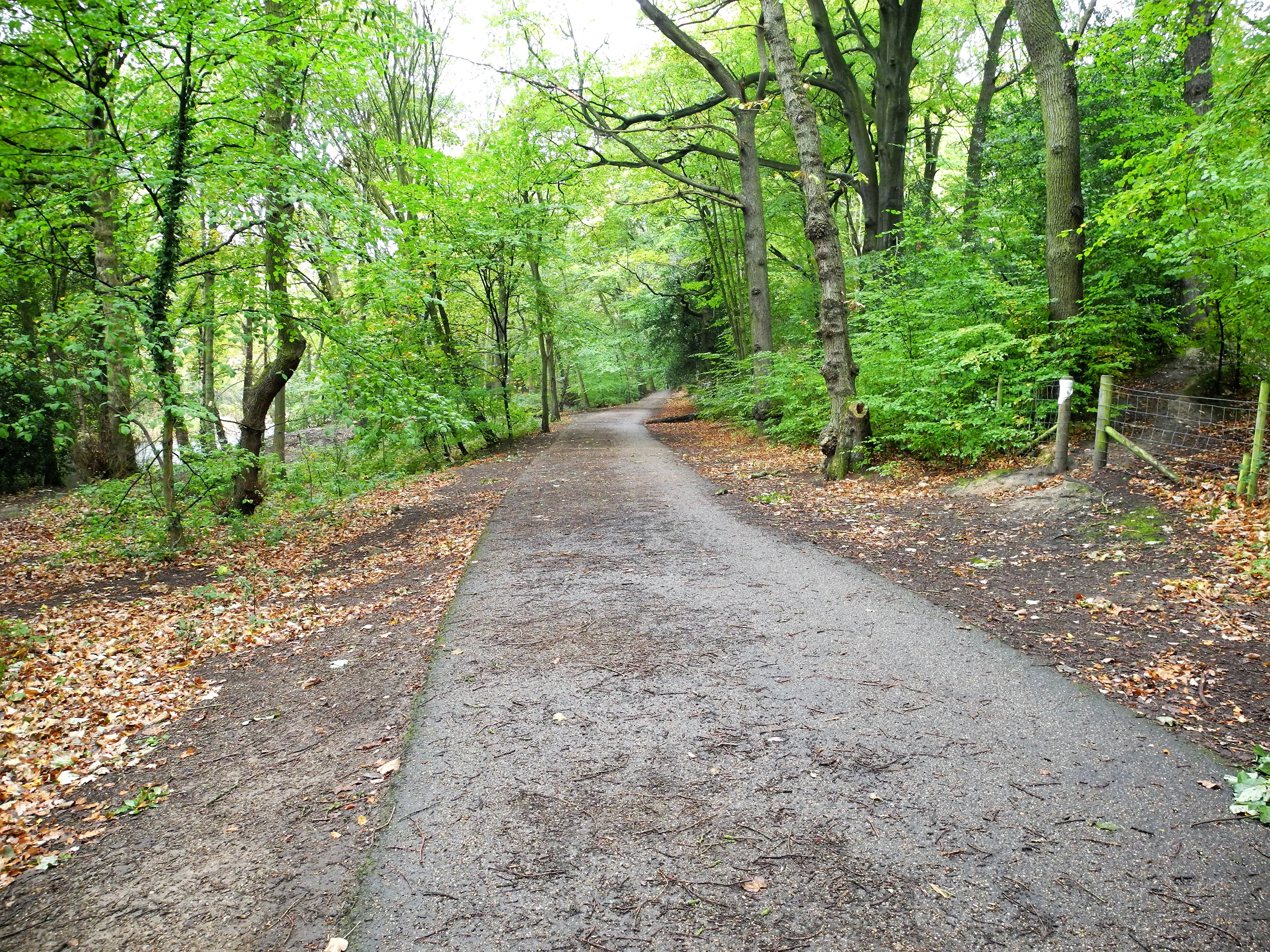
The walk has been surfaced in Beeley Wood

The next one and a half mile section to reach Beeley Wood is once more on asphalt roads, there are two recommended routes, one goes via Middlewood Road with the route leaflet recommending a visit to the Niagara weir at the bottom of the Winn Gardens estate, however the weir was damaged in the 2007 floods and is now only half of its original height of 10 feet and not so impressive. The route then continues through Middlewood Park to the closed Middlewood Tavern to enter Beeley Wood by the Rocher footbridge. The alternative from Wardsend goes by Herries Road South, Clay Wheels Lane and Beeley Wood Lane. The final mile of the walk through Beeley Wood is on a hard surfaced path which can be used by cyclists and is much used by runners and dog walkers. The path emerges in the centre of Oughtibridge (53°26′11″N 1°32′16″W). (//silk.mock.spring)

== Further expansion ==
At its annual general meeting in June 2022, the Upper Don Trail Trust announced various plans to extend the trail in the future. Extensions beyond Oughtibridge include a new section of riverside trail at the site of the former British Tissues paper mill between Oughtibridge and Wharncliffe Side which has been converted into a new housing development by David Wilson Homes. Additionally a new section of trail is planned on the site of the former Morehall tip where the Ewden Beck joins the Don. Current efforts (2025) are focused on securing two critical links through the Oughtibridge Valley estate: gaining access to the existing path north of Aspen Road to Holmes Farm and Wharncliffe Woods, and completing the link over the river to Oughtibridge village. Barnsley Council has used European Union funding to extend the trail beyond Stocksbridge using a former rail track past Underbank Reservoir and up to Langsett Reservoir.
