= The Bath Hotel, Sheffield =

Listed pub in South Yorkshire, England

The Bath Hotel
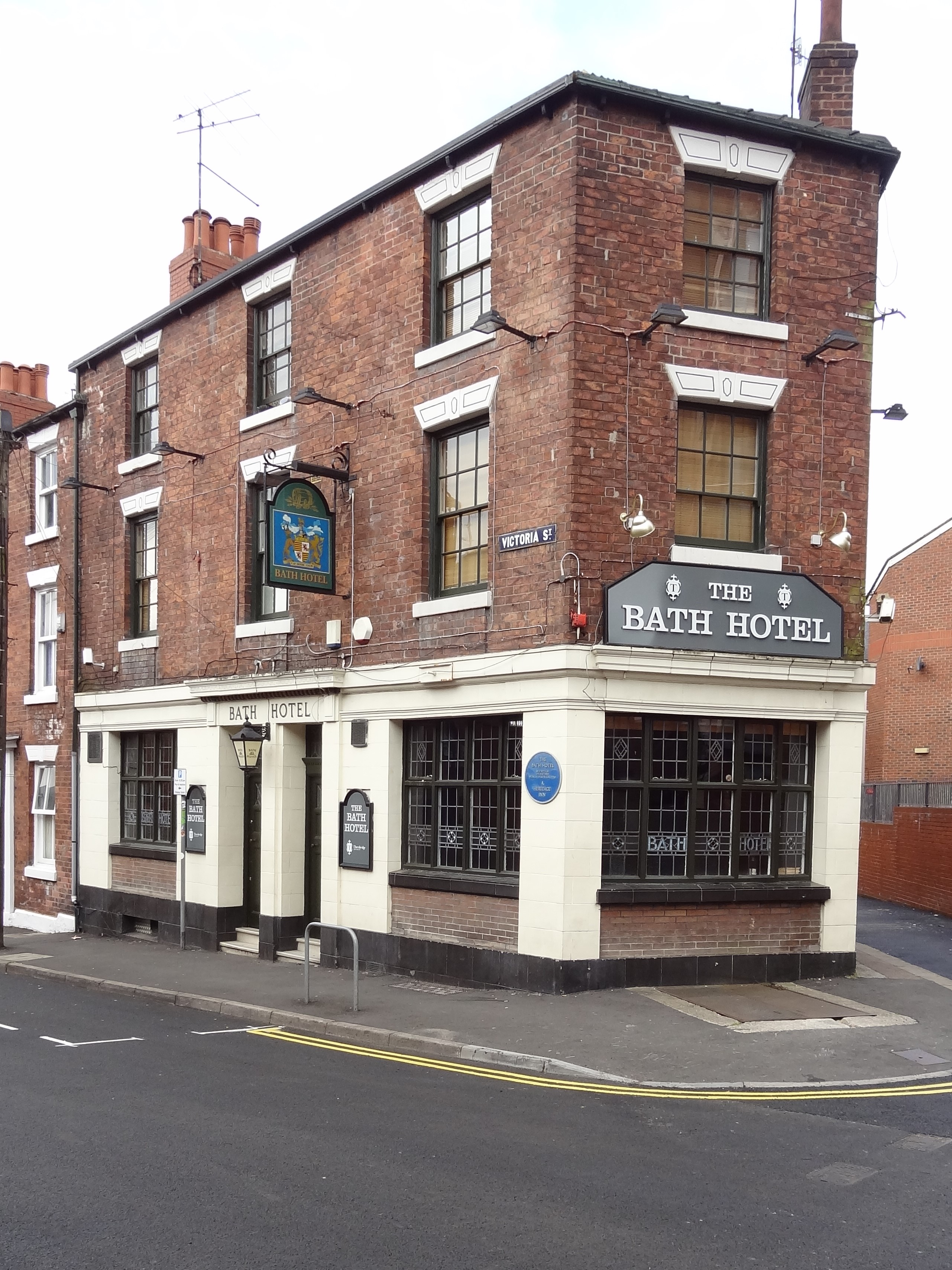
- The pub in 2018

General information
- Type: Public house
- Location: 66–68 Victoria Street, Broomhall, Sheffield, England
- Coordinates: 53.37923°N 1.48225°W
- Year built: c. 1868; 158 years ago
- Renovated: 1931 (remodelled and extended); 2001 (restored)
- Owner: Independent

Design and construction
- Designations

Listed Building – Grade II
- Official name: Bath Hotel
- Designated: 29 July 1999
- Reference no.: 1387759

Website
- thebathhotelpub.com

The Bath Hotel is a Grade II listed public house on Victoria Street in the Broomhall district of Sheffield, England. Built in about 1868 as a grocer's shop and beerhouse, it was enlarged and remodelled in 1931. It is included on the Campaign for Real Ale (CAMRA)'s National Inventory of Historic Pub Interiors, where it is recognised as having an interior of "outstanding national historic importance".

== History ==
Built in about 1868, the premises originally occupied only the corner section of the building and functioned as both a grocer's shop and a beerhouse. The name "Bath Hotel" was first recorded in 1908, although the property continued to be listed as a grocer's for some years afterwards. According to David Gamston's Yorkshire's Real Heritage Pubs (2014), Ind Coope acquired the property in 1914. However, both the National Heritage List for England and the Campaign for Real Ale (CAMRA)'s online heritage pub entry record the acquisition as taking place in 1920. The pub, named after the nearby Glossop Road Baths, was substantially enlarged and remodelled in 1931, when the adjoining house was incorporated. The building remains a notably complete example of an early 20th-century corner public house, retaining much of its 1931 layout and interior character.

On 29 July 1999, the Bath Hotel was designated a Grade II listed building. It is regarded by CAMRA as having an interior of "outstanding national historic importance" and is rated three stars on its National Inventory of Historic Pub Interiors. It was restored in 2001, with the work winning the national Pub Conservation Award in 2003. As of June 2026 the pub's freehold was independently owned.

== Architecture ==
=== Exterior ===
The building is constructed of brick, with decorative tiled detailing at ground-floor level and a slate-covered roof. It occupies a sharply angled corner position and was arranged around a central serving area that connected two public rooms, with a separate sales section formerly provided.

The main frontage rises to three storeys along Victoria Street and around the corner, stepping down to two storeys towards the rear. The upper floors contain regularly spaced sash windows, while the ground floor retains historic windows, some incorporating decorative coloured glass. The pub's name is displayed both within the glazing and on a sign panel above the entrance. A prominent chimney stands along the Covent Walk side, where a single-storey extension containing toilet facilities was added in 1931.

=== Interior ===
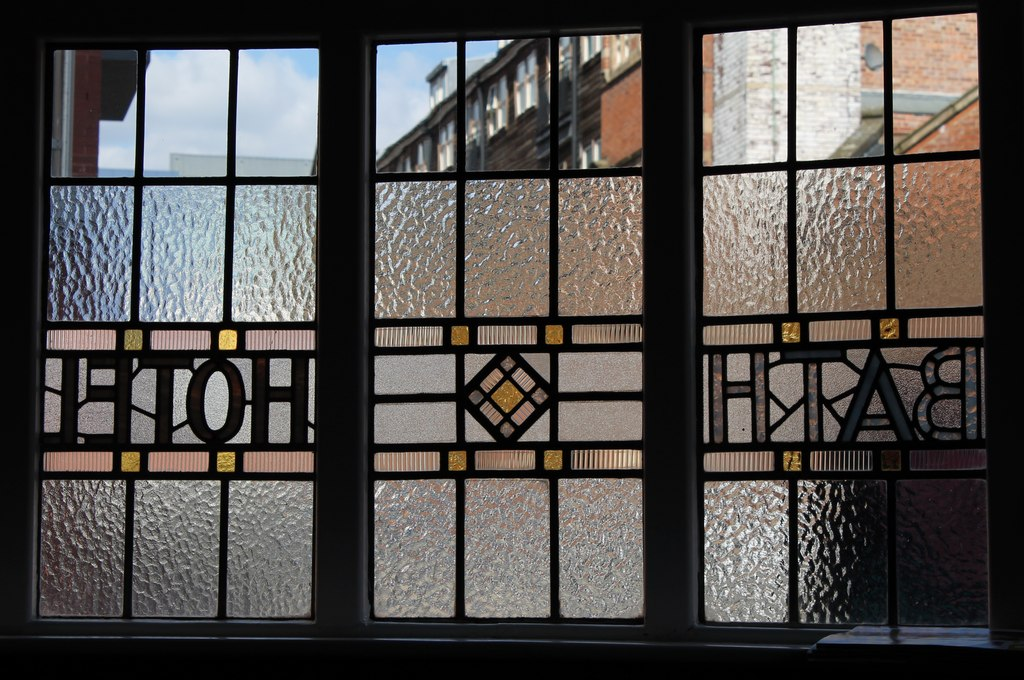
Stained glass, seen from inside the pub in 2013

Inside, the pub retains two bars: a main bar and a lounge snug located in the sharply angled corner of the building. The two rooms are connected by a corridor, which also provides access to the serving area and reflects the building's historic provision for standing drinkers. Features dating from the 1931 remodelling include the original tiled floor, the bar counter with its distinctive tiled front, fixed seating, internal doors and decorative glazed screens. The lounge snug retains a serving hatch, while much of the historic character of both rooms survives. Historic England describes it as "an unusually complete example of a Sheffield corner public house".

== See also ==
- Listed buildings in Sheffield S3
