= Sheffield Ski Village =

Dry ski slope in Sheffield, England

Coordinates: 53.398889°N 1.476974°W

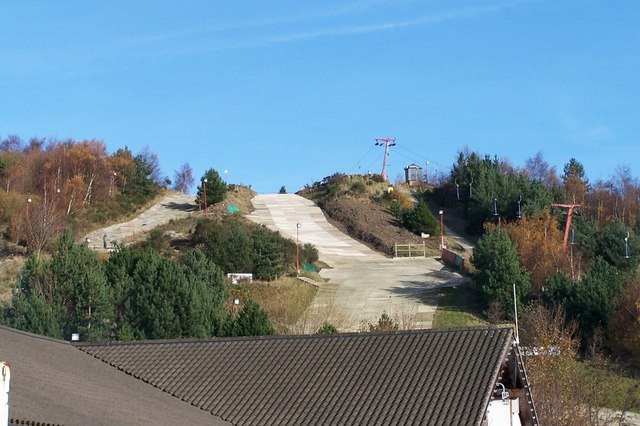
Sheffield Ski Village, November 2008

Sheffield Ski Village was an artificial ski slope complex in the Parkwood Springs area of Sheffield, England which operated from 1988 until it was destroyed by fire in 2012. It was believed to be the largest artificial ski resort in Europe with a sports shop, bar, restaurant and a range of slopes which included a Snowflex nursery slope, a Dendix recreational slope and a freestyle park consisting of a half pipe, hip jump, kicker, a quarter pipe and various grind rails.

== Facilities ==
The first slope at the ski village opened in October 1988. The ski village proved popular and by the end of 1990 the ski village had 8 slopes. During 1991 to 1994 the ski village underwent a significant re-design - adding a ski lodge, bar and shops. The slopes were also re-designed during this period to add a half pipe and moguls. In subsequent years additional facilities were added including an aerials water ramp and a toboggan run.

In addition to the Ski Village slopes there was a ten pin bowling alley, quad biking, laser tag and a downhill biking track designed by Steve Peat. Ski Village Bowling housed a state of the art ten pin bowling alley which opened in 2009. The full sized ten pin bowling lanes were built with Brunswick technology.

== Activities ==
The Sheffield Ski Village was one of the main training grounds for the Yorkshire Freestyle Squad and many professional freestyle skiers, such as James Woods and Katie Summerhayes. Other significant British athletes who trained at Sheffield Ski Village include Ellie Koyander (Women's Moguls, 2010 Winter Olympics) and Paddy Graham (Pro freeskier sponsored by Red Bull.)

== Fires ==
On 29 April 2012, the main building of the Ski Village was destroyed by a fire. The blaze occurred in the early hours of the morning and no-one was injured. This fire was subsequently ruled to have started accidentally, with subsequent fires on the site being treated as arson.

On 1 May 2012, a small hut at the top of the main slope containing controls for the ski lifts was destroyed in a second fire in the early hours of the morning.

On 21 May 2012, the former snowflex nursery slope was partially destroyed in a third fire, again started deliberately.

On 24 April 2013, the remaining wooden outbuildings of the former Adventure Mountain outdoor playground were set on fire, destroying the only remaining infrastructure on the site.

By August 2016 the site had suffered from approximately 50 arson attacks.

On 11 April 2017, a further arson attack at the site occurred after two fires were started.

On 22 September 2017, a fire broke out in the old pump house in an incident thought to be an accident caused by another bonfire nearby.

On 14 October 2017, a fire broke out at the site and the fire brigade were called, who found some fly tipped items and some of the material used to make the old ski slopes alight.

On 6 June 2018, the site was again reported to be on fire.

On 20 July 2022, the site was again reported to be on fire.

An unrelated wildfire on adjacent grassland swept into the Ski Village site on 2 September 2018, causing further damage to numerous buildings and structures on the site.

On 23 April 2025, the site was again reported to be on fire.

Since the initial fire, the site has remained closed to the public aside from a brief attempt by the Sharks Ski Club to hold sessions in May 2012, which were stopped when the ski lift motors and power ancillaries were stolen. The site has stood derelict and has been blighted by significant fly tipping, theft, arson and vandalism ever since.

== Campaign to rebuild ==
A local campaign group formed by members of the former slope management staff has been started with the objective of eventually reopening the former Ski Village site and operating it as a hub for snowsports excellence in the UK. The Snowsport for Sheffield group is headed by former Ski School manager Al Bister, and Paul Yiend former Snowboard Instructor and has already generated significant support from local residents and notable press coverage.

On 9 December 2016, Sheffield City Council asked for potential investors to propose future uses for the site. The preferred uses for the site by the council are for a snowsports centre or mountain bike centre. Developers had until 7 April 2017 to submit their proposals. However, due to stronger than expected interest in development for the site Sheffield City Council extended the deadline by a further two weeks till 21 April.

On 28 November 2017 it was announced that developers Extreme wanted to rebuild on the site, and redevelop a £22.5 million extreme sports centre. And on 28 January 2019 Sheffield City Council agreed a loan of £4.8 million towards the project.Extreme's plan never materialised.

The 'Revive Sheffield Ski Village' campaign has been lobbying to bring back skiing to the site.

In 2022 Sheffield City Council began discussions with a developer, New Zealand adventure tourism firm, Skyline Enterprises. There are plans to build a luge ride, a family playground, a zip line and surf wave experience. Sheffield City Council has allocated £12m to improve road junctions and build a new road connecting Oakham Drive with Vale Road. A public consultation to discuss Skyline Enterprises' plans is expected in take place in September 2026.
