= Five Weirs Walk =

5-mile footpath in Sheffield, England

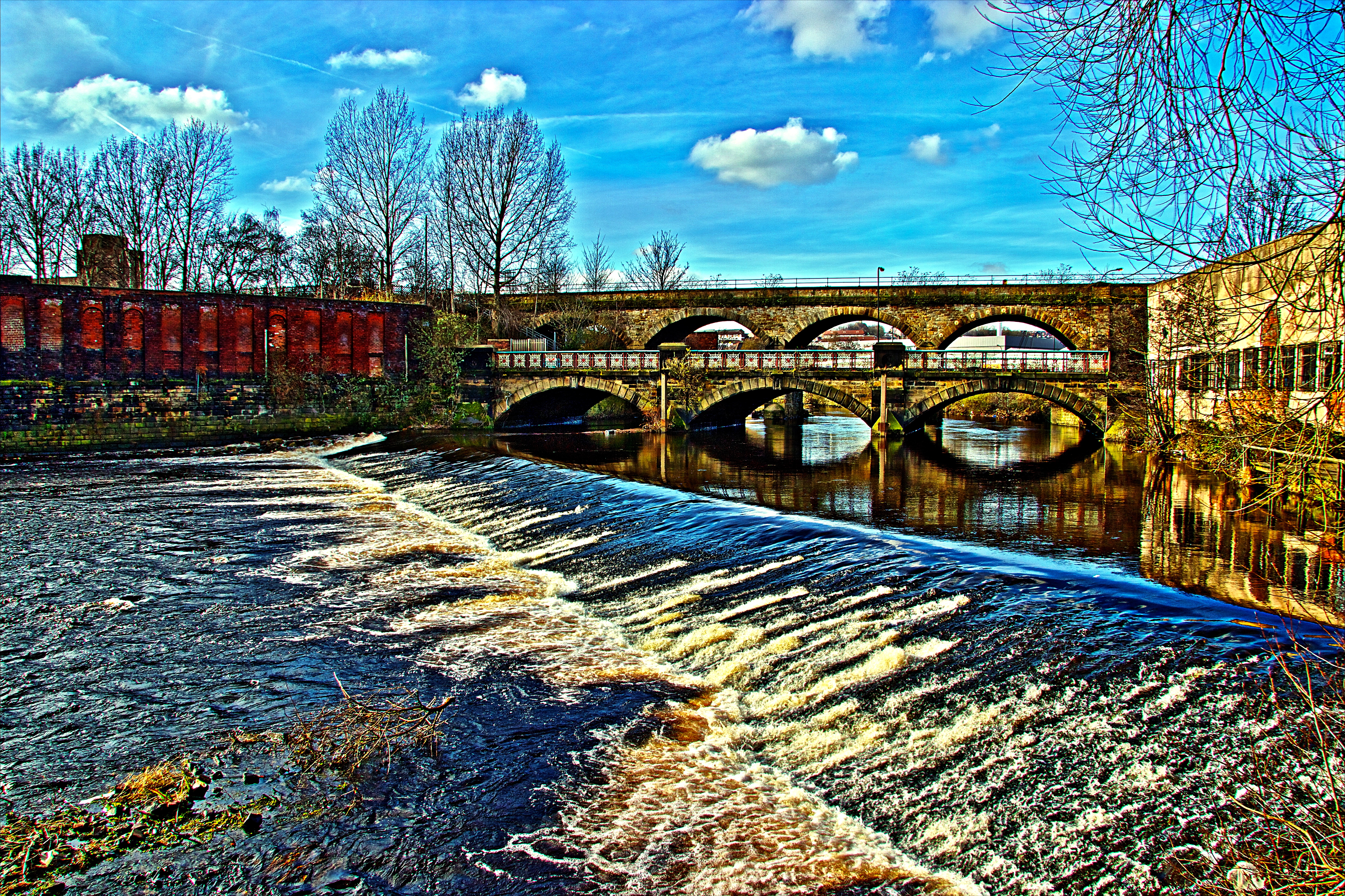
Five Weirs Walk

The 5-mile-long (8 km) Five Weirs Walk runs alongside the River Don in Sheffield, England. From Lady's Bridge in Sheffield City Centre (53°23′09″N 1°27′51″W), it heads downstream, northeast, over the Cobweb Bridge, through Attercliffe to Meadowhall (53°25′00″N 1°24′34″W).

As the name of the walk suggests, it passes five weirs. It is now possible to continue the walk along the Don, under the Tinsley Viaduct, to Rotherham. As of 2010, the section of the walk between Sheffield and Meadowhall has been linked with the parallel Sheffield and Tinsley Canal towpath as a 8-mile (13 km) circular walk known as the Blue Loop. The walk links with the Upper Don Walk at Lady's Bridge.

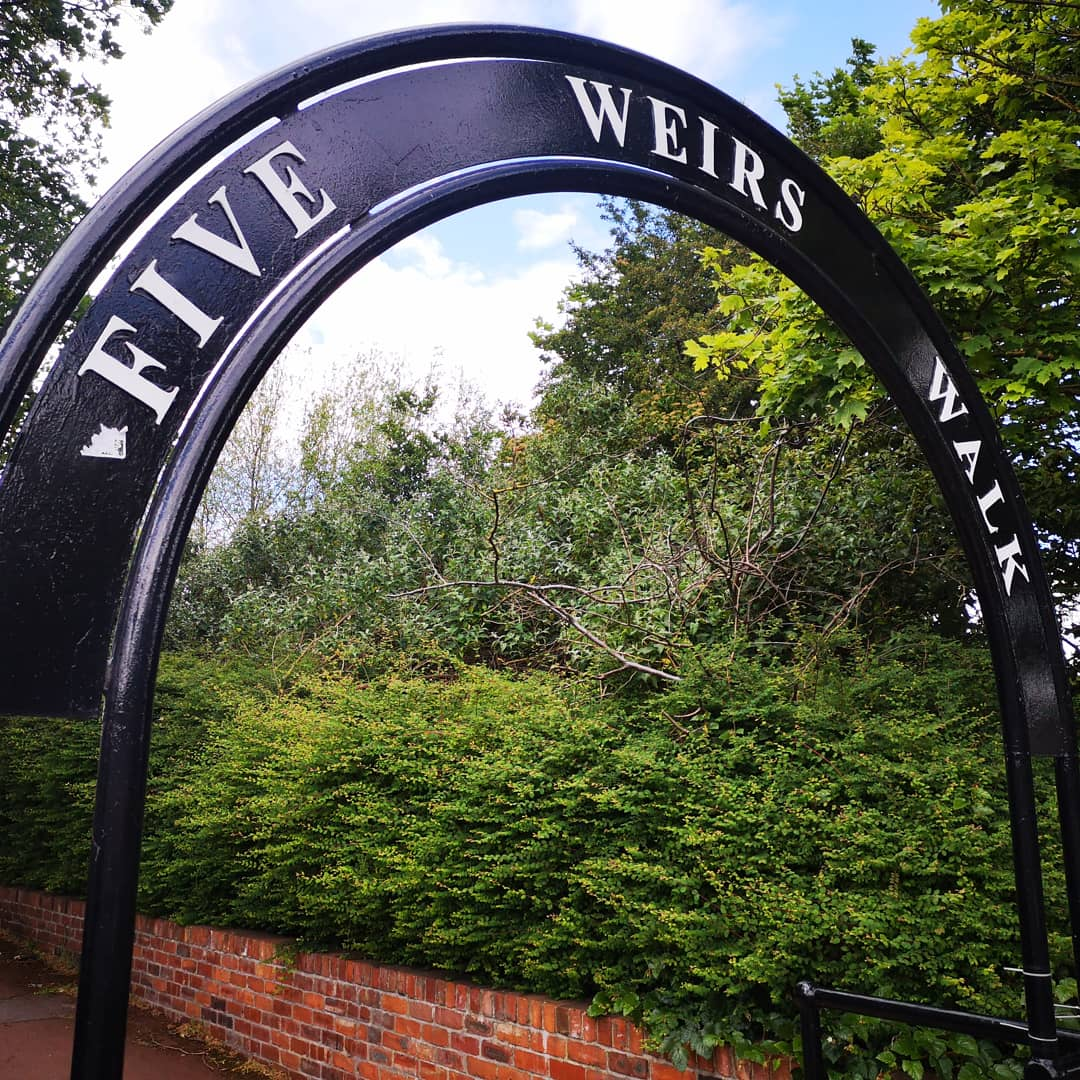

== History ==
The Walk was conceived, developed and steered to completion by the Five Weirs Walk Trust, a handful of enthusiasts bolstered by support from statutory authorities, private companies, local charities, national funding bodies and countless members of the public. Over a period of 20 years and more, the Walk developed from a bright idea to a keystone in the regeneration of the urban river corridor.

A detail history can be found in the following document by the University of Sheffield:

Five Weirs Walk History

== Weirs ==
1. Walk Mill Weir

Walk Mill includes bypass steps for kayakers & canoeists to avoid the weir.

2. Burton Weir

3. Sanderson's Weir – This weir includes a fishpass which was also designed to accommodate safe passage for canoes & kayaks.

4. Brightside Weir

5. Hadfield's Weir

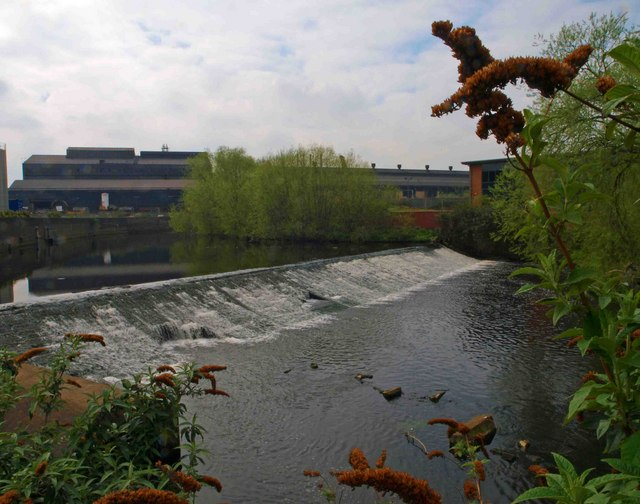
Brightside Weir

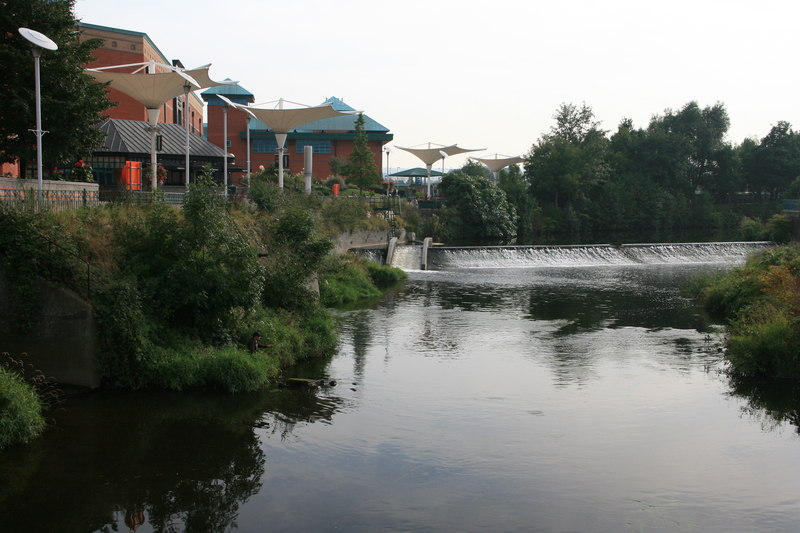
Hadfield's Weir

== Salmon Pastures nature reserve ==
Salmon Pastures is a small (0.19 ha (0.47 acres)) nature reserve, managed by the Wildlife Trust for Sheffield and Rotherham, adjacent to the walk. The site is visited by mistle thrush, bullfinch, goldfinch and long tailed tit. Kingfishers, little grebe, moorhens and mallards can be seen on the adjacent banks of the River Don. Invertebrates such as dragonflies, moths, butterflies and hoverfly can be seen at the reserve.
