= Glossop Road Baths =

Building in Sheffield, South Yorkshire, England

Coordinates: 53.3798°N 1.4820°W

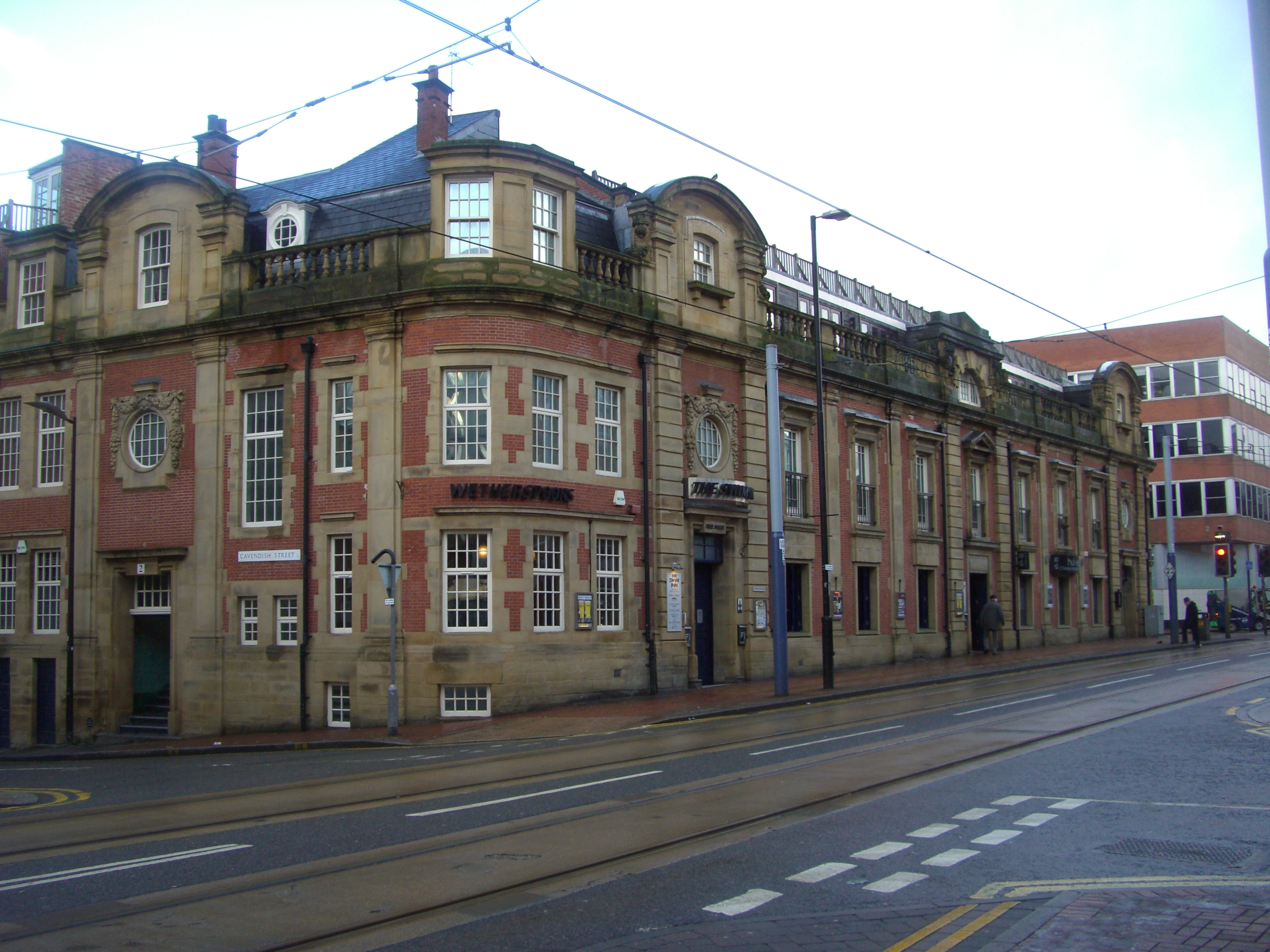
The building in 2009, nearly two decades after closure of the baths

Glossop Road Baths is a building in Sheffield, South Yorkshire, England, part of which housed the city's first public baths when it opened in 1836. It remains in use, its ownership, and the facilities provided, changing over the years.

The first public baths in the city were opened on the site in 1836, following the cholera epidemic of 1832. The complex was rebuilt from 1877 to 1879 to a design by E. M. Gibbs, including an indoor swimming pool was opened, a Turkish bath suite and a hairdresser. In 1898, the complex was bought by the city council and a ladies' bath was added. The façade was rebuilt in 1908–1910 by Arthur Nunweek.

After a period of decline at the end of the 20th century and later closure of the baths, the building was largely converted to residential accommodation, with a Wetherspoons bar called "The Swim Inn" in the former main swimming pool area. The rooms of the Victorian Turkish baths were repurposed and converted into a modern day spa, reopening as Spa 1877 in 2004. This closed in 2019, and reopened in November 2023.
