= Kelham Island Tavern =

Public house in Sheffield, England

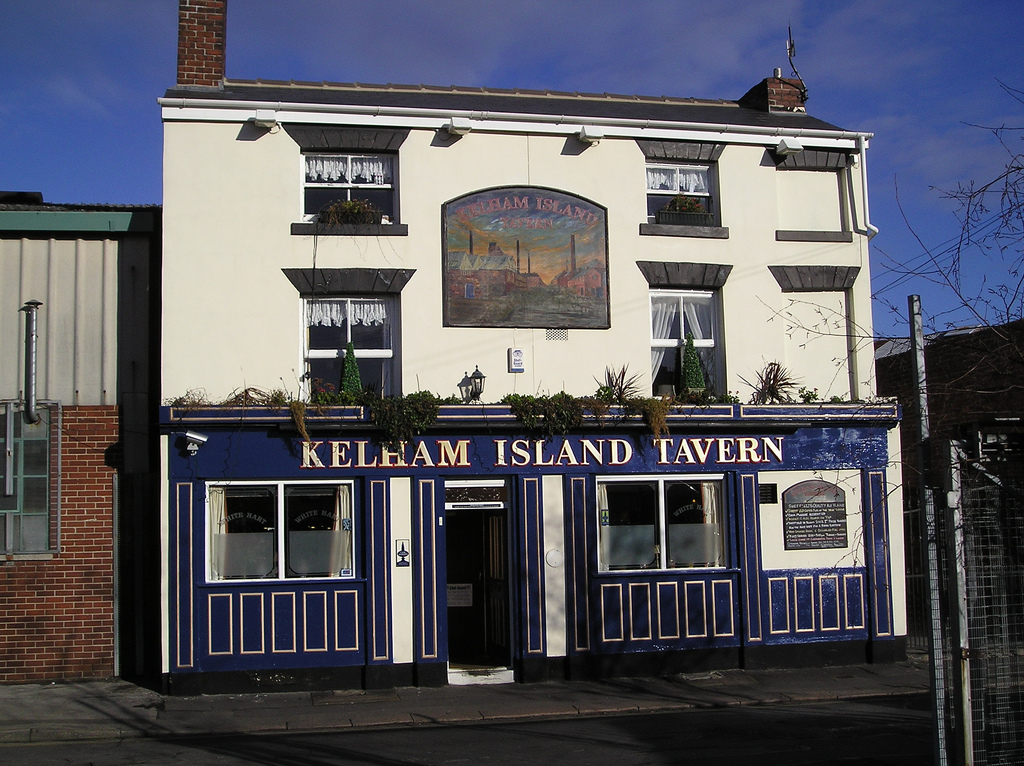
- The Kelham Island Tavern in 2005
- Interactive map of the Kelham Island Tavern area

General information
- Location: 62 Russell Street, Sheffield, S3 8RW
- Coordinates: 53°23′18″N 1°28′20″W
- Opened: 2002 (as Kelham Island Tavern)

The Kelham Island Tavern is a public house in Sheffield. It was the first pub to have become the Campaign for Real Ale (CAMRA) National Pub of the Year two years running.

The pub lies on Russell Street, in the Kelham Island area of the city. It was constructed in the 1830s as part of a terrace, and originally operated as "The Sawmaker". It was later renamed the "White Hart", and in the early 1990s became the "Kelham Island Tavern", but closed soon after.

The derelict building was re-opened as the "Kelham Island Tavern" in 2002, specialising in real ales. By the following year, the local press mentioned it as one of five pubs in the area among the "best real ale pubs in Yorkshire". Following an inundation during the 2007 United Kingdom floods, it closed for a five-week refurbishment. It won the CAMRA pub of the year award for 2008, and took the title again the following year, becoming the first pub to win the title two years running. It has also won the Yorkshire Pub of the Year title in 2004, 2007, 2008 and 2009, and the Sheffield Pub of the Year award every year from 2004 to 2011 and later from 2013 to 2018.

The pub has a small garden featuring palm trees, and is also a venue for traditional English folk music.
