= Brooklyn Works =

Building in Sheffield, South Yorkshire, England

Coordinates: 53.3898°N 1.4757°W

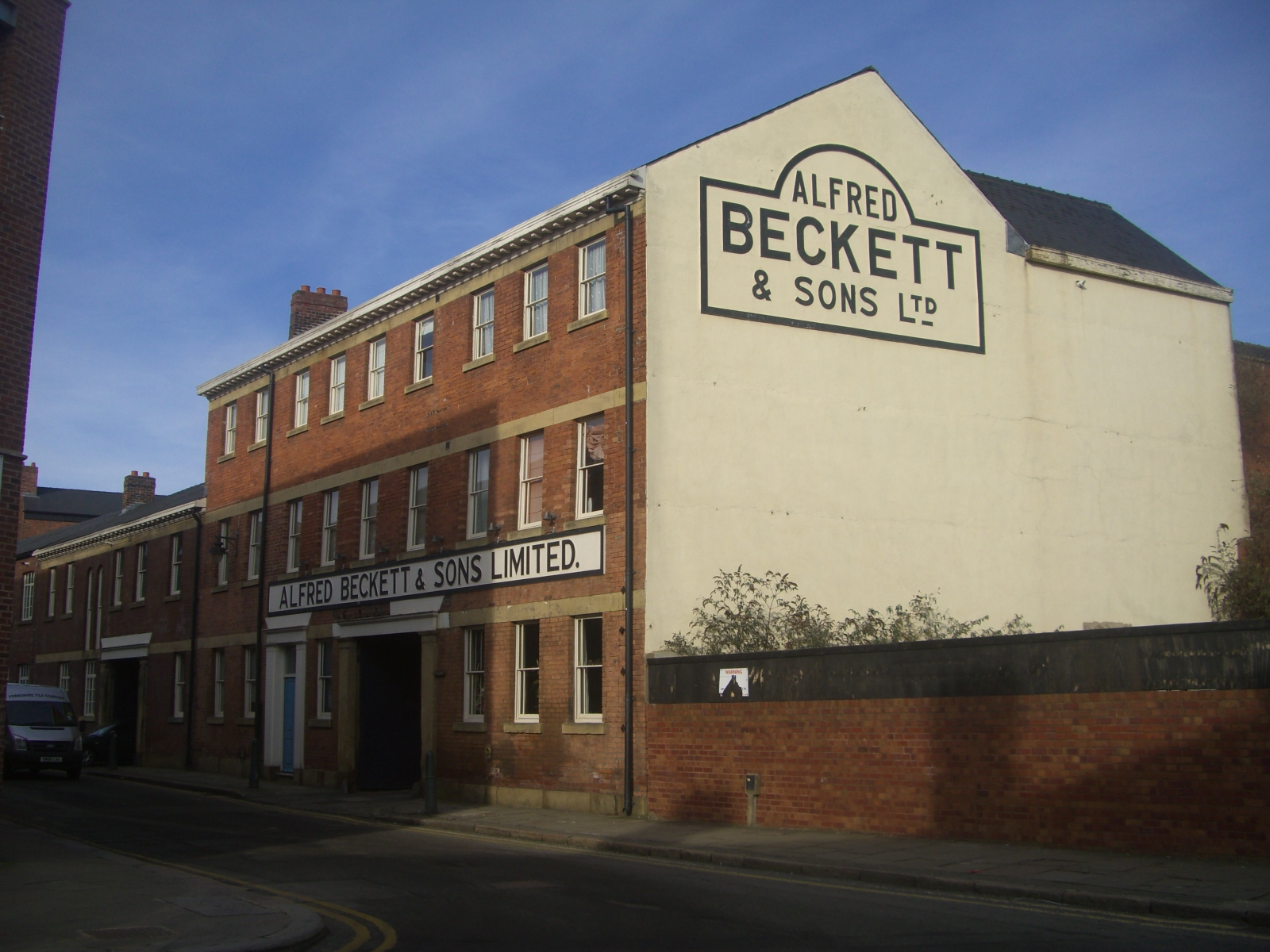
The Green Lane frontage

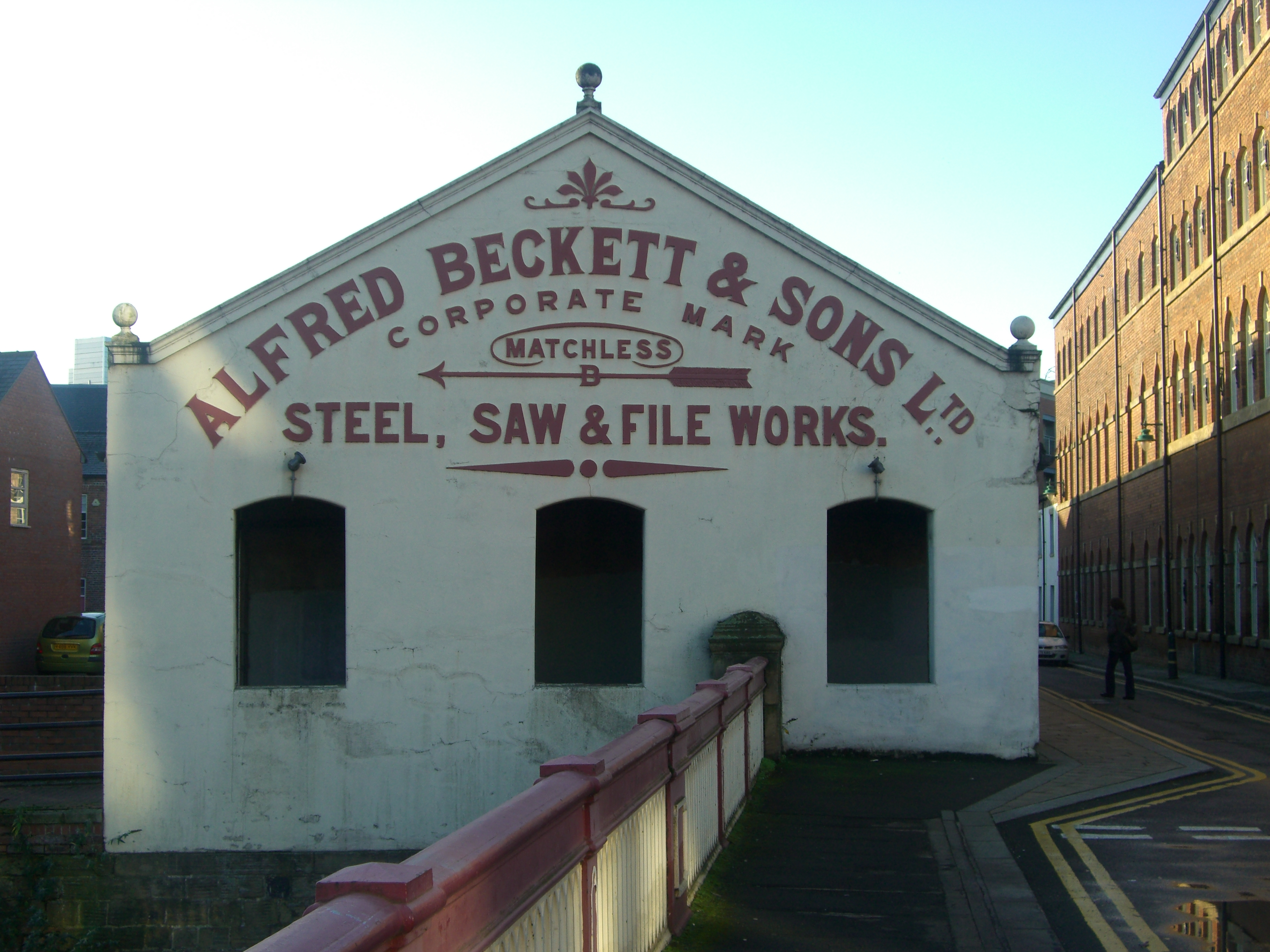
The original signage viewed from Ball bridge at the northern end of the building

The Brooklyn Works is a former site of steel, saw and file manufacture, it is situated on Green Lane in the Kelham Island Quarter of the City of Sheffield, England. In recent years the works have been converted into residential apartments and offices. The structure is a Grade II listed building because of its importance as an example of Sheffield’s industrial heritage. The works stand adjacent to the listed industrial buildings of the Green Lane Works and Cornish Place in what has been called "the most coherent stretch of industrial landscape in inner Sheffield".

== History ==
The Brooklyn Works were constructed in the mid 19th century for the firm of Alfred Beckett, a manufacturer of steel, saws and files. The building suffered seriously damaged in March 1864 when the Great Sheffield Flood surged down the Don valley. Alfred Beckett put in a compensation claim of £123 11s 2d for damage to the works, with local journalist Samuel Harrison writing at the time:

“The works of Messrs. Beckett and Slater, steel, saw, and file manufacturers, were injured to a serious extent. The boundary wall was carried away, and a large steam engine boiler was torn from its bed, and washed down some hundreds of yards into the works of Messrs. Wheatman and Smith. A quantity of machinery was broken to pieces, furnaces were extinguished, and various finished goods were spoiled.”

Alfred Beckett & Sons Ltd continued to manufacture at the Brooklyn Works until the mid-1960s using the “Matchless” trademark, during this time there were several structural additions to the works. In 1967 Alfred Beckett & Sons was purchased by the Tempered Spring Company Ltd of Sheffield. The building stood empty for a period of time and was declared a listed building in November 1985 to protect it from demolition. In the 1990s the Sheffield-based firm of AXIS Architecture turned the disused works into residential apartments and offices for small businesses. Among the small businesses now using the Brooklyn Works are a public relations agency, a firm of solicitors and a web design company.

== Architecture ==
The building is constructed from red brick, partly rendered with ashlars dressing with a slate roof. It is a series of four ranges of two- and three-storey buildings making a square with an inner courtyard. The northern range of buildings fronts onto the River Don and consists of seven blocks of three storey apartments. These are newly built and replace the original single-storey building which was demolished in the 1990s refurbishment. The old cart entrance has been adapted to allow vehicles access to the inner courtyard where there is parking. The restored building has retained some of the original signage from the days of Alfred Beckett & Sons.
