= Alfred Stevens (sculptor) =

British sculptor (1817–1875)

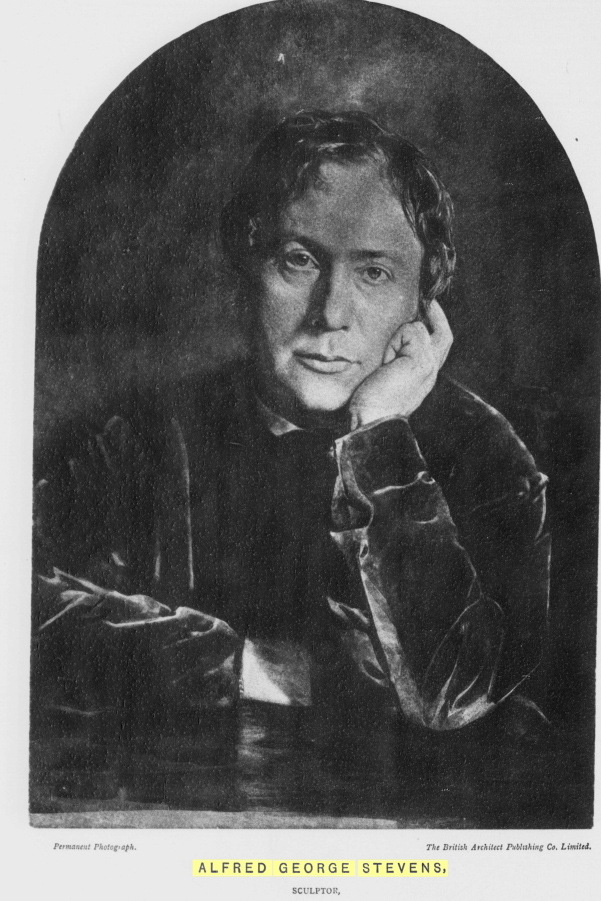
- Photograph of Alfred Stevens (from British Architect, published posthumously)
- Born: 30 December 1817; Blandford Forum, Dorset, England
- Died: 1 May 1875 (aged 57); London, England
- Education: Accademia di Belle Arti of Florence, Italy
- Known for: Sculpture
- Patrons: Rev. Samuel Best

Alfred George Stevens (30 December 1817 – 1 May 1875), was a British sculptor. His major work is the monument to the Duke of Wellington in St Paul's Cathedral.

== Early life ==
Alfred Stevens was born on 30 December 1817 at Blandford Forum in Dorset, the son of a decorator and joiner. At the age of ten, he entered his father's workshop as an assistant. In 1833, the rector of his parish enabled him to go to Italy, where he spent nine years studying at Naples, Bologna, Siena, Pompeii, Capri, Rome, Milan, Venice, and Florence where he studied for a time at the Accademia di Belle Arti. Stevens had never attended an English school. In 1841, Bertel Thorvaldsen employed him for a year in Rome. After a significant period of study and training throughout Italy, Stevens returned to England.

== Career ==
In 1845, Stevens obtained a tutorial position in the Government School of Design at Somerset House, London, where he remained until 1847. In 1850 he became chief artist to the Sheffield firm of H.E. Hoole and Co. who specialised in bronze and metal work. While in Sheffield it is thought that Stevens devised plans which were eventually integrated into the design of the ornate gateway of the Green Lane Works of 1860. In 1852 he returned to London. To this period belongs his design for the vases on the railings in front of the British Museum, and also the lions on the dwarf posts which were subsequently transferred to the inside of the museum.

In 1856, Stevens took part in the competition for the Wellington monument, originally intended to be set up under one of the great arches of St Paul's Cathedral, though it was only consigned to that position in 1892. Stevens agreed to carry out the monument for £20,000 – a quite derisory sum, as it turned out. Stevens devoted most of his career to this grand monument, constantly harassed and finally worn out by the interference of government, want of money and other difficulties.

Stevens did not live to see the monument set up. For many years it was placed in a small side chapel, where the effect was utterly destroyed and its magnificent bronze groups hidden from view. Stevens was aware of the position finally decided on for the work, and he suppressed the equestrian group intended for the summit and left the model for the latter feature in a rough state. On the removal of the monument from the chapel to the inter-columnar space on the north side of the nave for which it was originally designed, the model of horse and man was placed in the hands of another sculptor, to be worked upon and cast in bronze. It was still not completed by 1920, after years of work and polemics, and it was feared that it would have a disastrous result on the masterpiece as a whole. The president of the Royal Institute of British Architects declared that the structure would not bear the weight of the addition.

The monument consists of a sarcophagus supporting a recumbent bronze effigy of the duke, over which is an arched marble canopy of late Renaissance style on delicately enriched shafts. At each end of the upper part of the canopy is a large bronze group, one representing "Truth tearing the tongue out of the mouth of False-hood", and the other "Valour trampling Cowardice underfoot". The two virtues are represented by very stately female figures; the vices are two nude male figures treated in a very massive way. The vigorous strength of these groups recalls the style of Michelangelo, but Stevens's work throughout is original and has a very distinct character of its own.

Owing to the many years he spent on this one work Stevens produced little other sculpture. In Dorchester House (demolished in 1929 to make way for the hotel of the same name), Park Lane, there was some of his work, most notably a mantelpiece supported by nude female caryatids in a crouching attitude, modelled with great largeness of style, now in the central refreshment room at the Victoria and Albert museum. He also designed the four mosaics of the prophets Isaiah, Jeremiah, Ezekiel and Daniel, which fill the spandrels under the dome of St Paul's Cathedral.

One of his pupils was Edgar Bundy.

== Personal life and death ==
Stevens resided at 7 Canning Place in Kensington, London. He died suddenly in his studio at 9 Eton Villas, Belsize Park, London, aged 57. The cause of his death is unspecified. He is buried in the western part of Highgate Cemetery in North London. His grave is a Grade II listed structure.

== Gallery ==
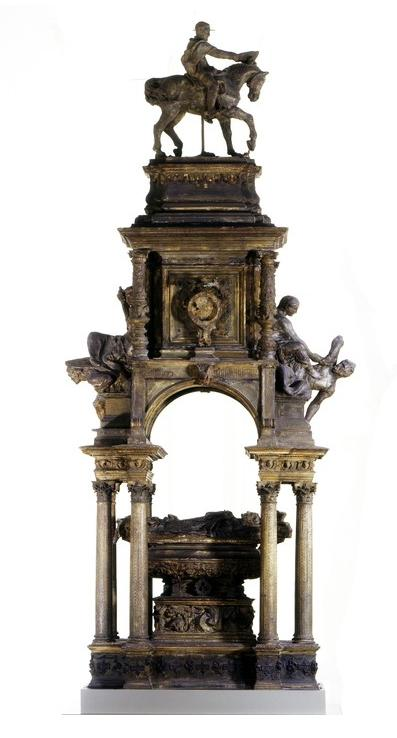
Plaster and wax model for the Wellington Monument, 1857. Victoria and Albert Museum, London

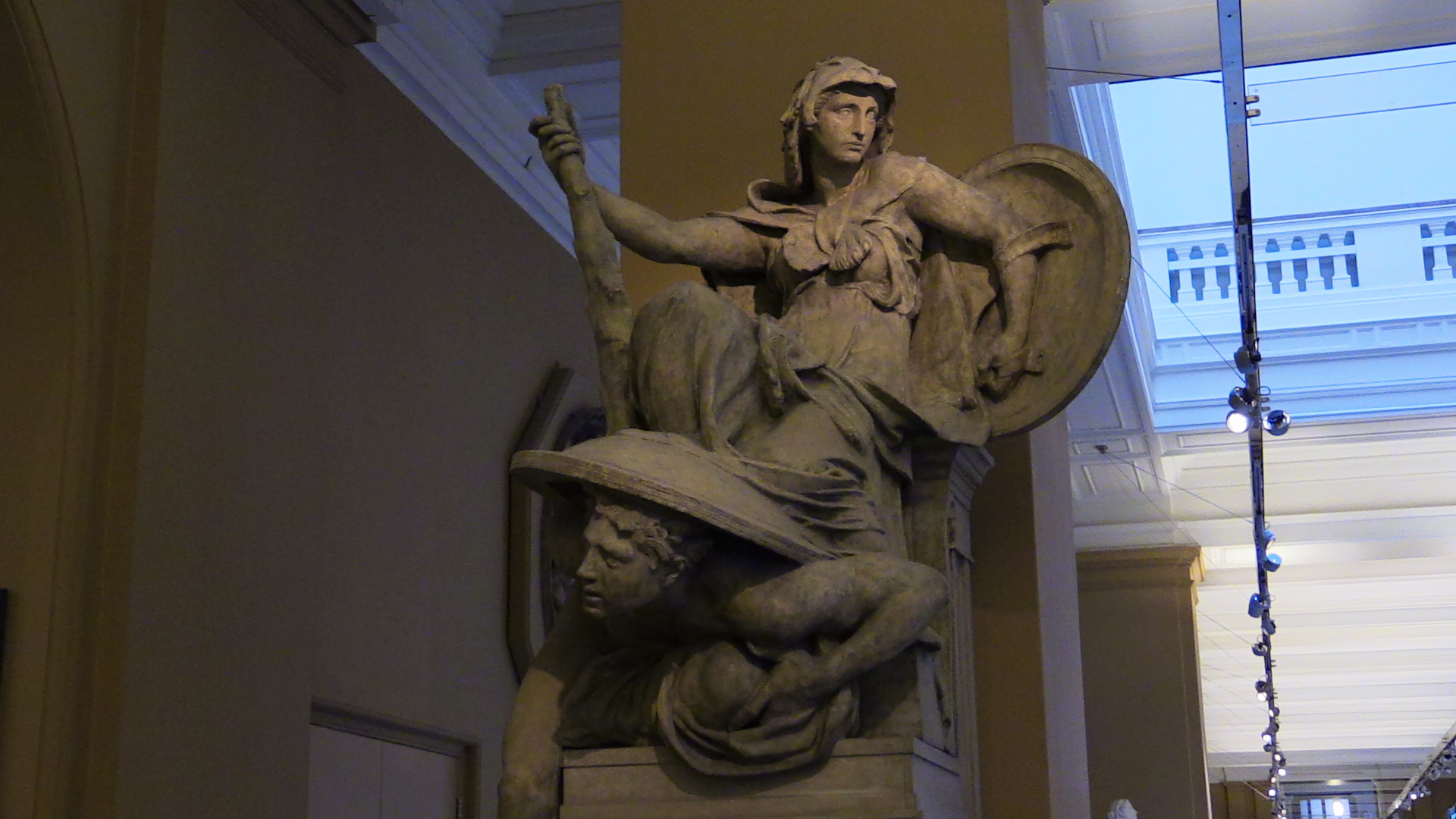
Model for "Valour and Cowardice", 1857-1866. Victoria and Albert Museum, London

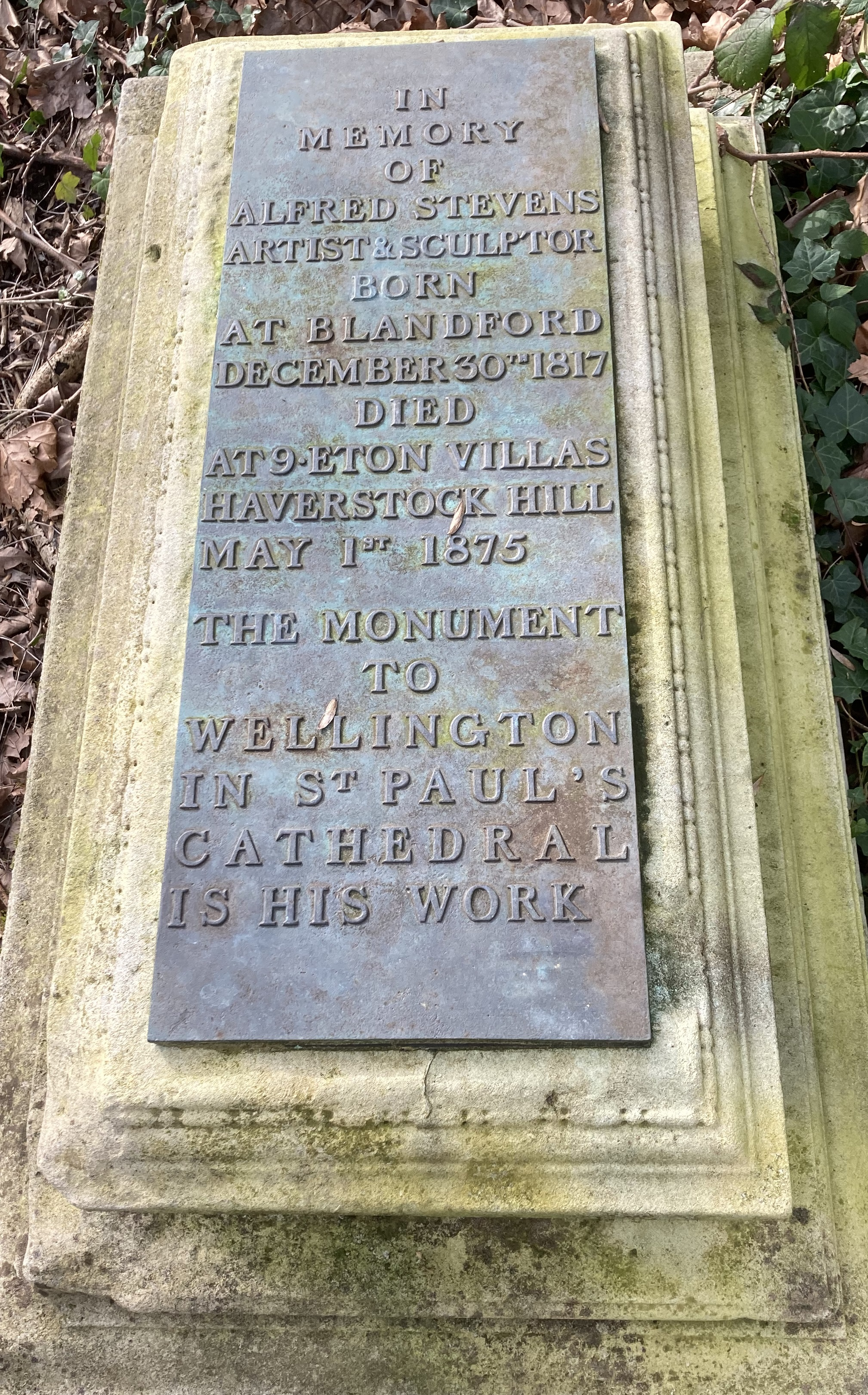
The grave of Alfred Stevens on the western side of Highgate Cemetery
