= Neepsend =

Suburb of Sheffield in South Yorkshire, England

Coordinates: 53.400°N 1.483°W

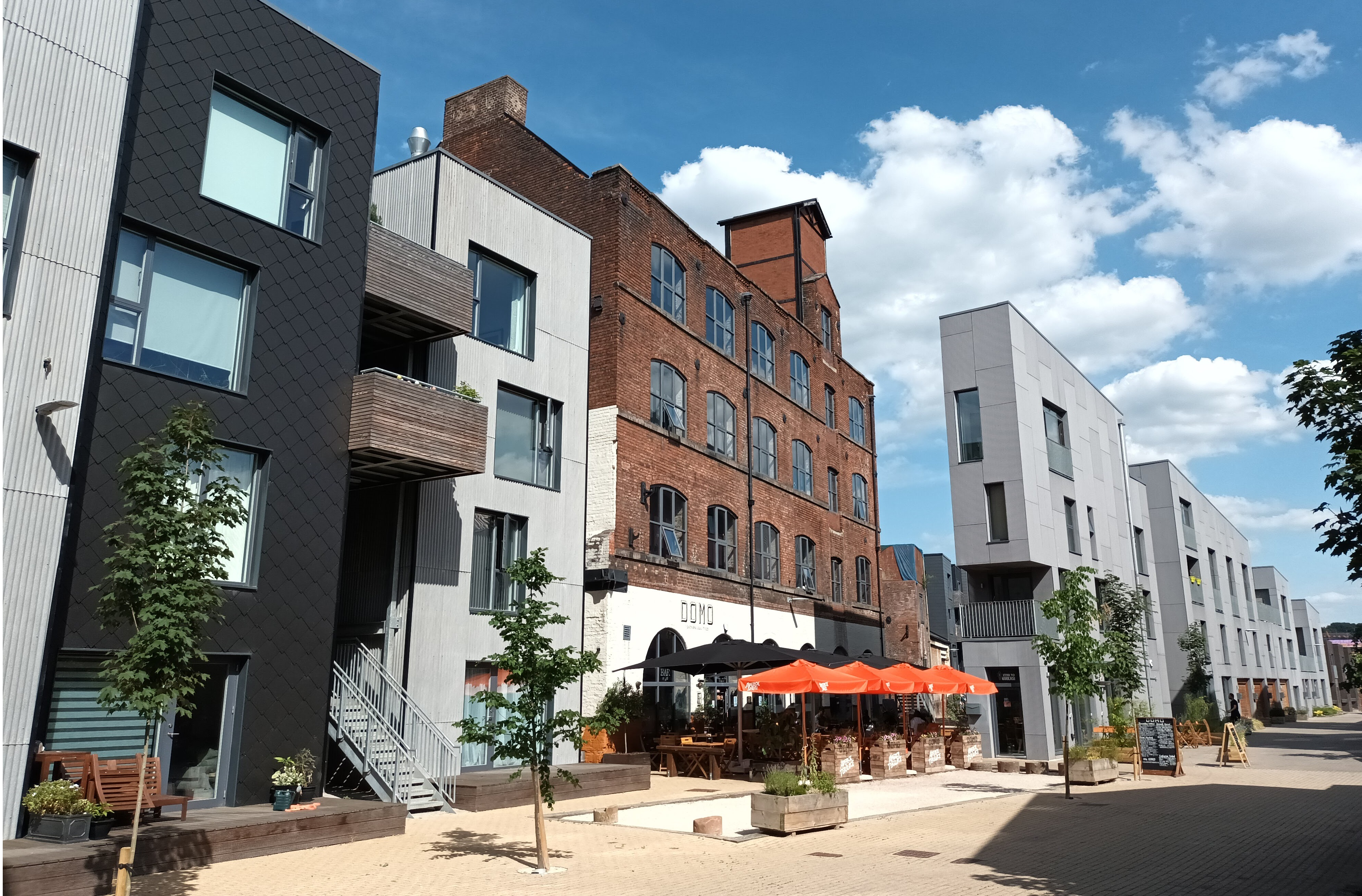
- Little Kelham Road

- Location within South Yorkshire
- Metropolitan borough: Sheffield
- Metropolitan county: South Yorkshire
- Region: Yorkshire and the Humber
- Country: England
- Sovereign state: United Kingdom
- Places: List: Kelham Island; Parkwood Springs
- Post town: SHEFFIELD
- Postcode district: S3
- Dialling code: 0114
- Police: South Yorkshire
- Fire: South Yorkshire
- Ambulance: Yorkshire
- UK Parliament: Sheffield Central

Neepsend is a suburb of the city of Sheffield, located just 1 mile (1.6 km) north-west of the city centre. The main area of Neepsend covers the flood plain of the River Don from Lady's Bridge at the Wicker up to Hillfoot Bridge. The suburb falls within Sheffield's City Ward. The adjacent district of Parkwood Springs is often regarded as part of the suburb.

== Etymology ==
The origin of the word Neepsend is believed to come from the Old Norse language, with the word "nypr" meaning a peak, the "end" part was added as Neepsend lies in the Don valley at the termination of a high ridge which descends from Shirecliffe and over Parkwood. The morphology of the ridge was changed when an artificial ski slope was created to form the Sheffield Ski Village. The Concise Oxford Dictionary of Place Names gives the word "Nipa" as of Swedish and Norwegian origin and means a crag or steep river bank. In a 1297 subsidy roll the suburb was referred to as Nipisend and in 1637 as Nypysend.

== History ==
There is no evidence of ancient settlement in Neepsend, the area being heavily forested with the steep ground to the north covered by the dense woodland of Old Park Wood, although a Late Bronze Age socketed axehead found close to Hillfoot Bridge in 1921 does suggest ancient human activity in the area. The Scandinavians arrived in the 10th century and started to clear the woodland and turn the valley floor by the River Don into fields and meadows. The wood was further cleared between the early 17th century and the mid 19th century for timber and by charcoal burners. A network of fields were left on the high ground and a local well or spring probably gave this district its name of Parkwood Springs.

=== Industrialisation ===
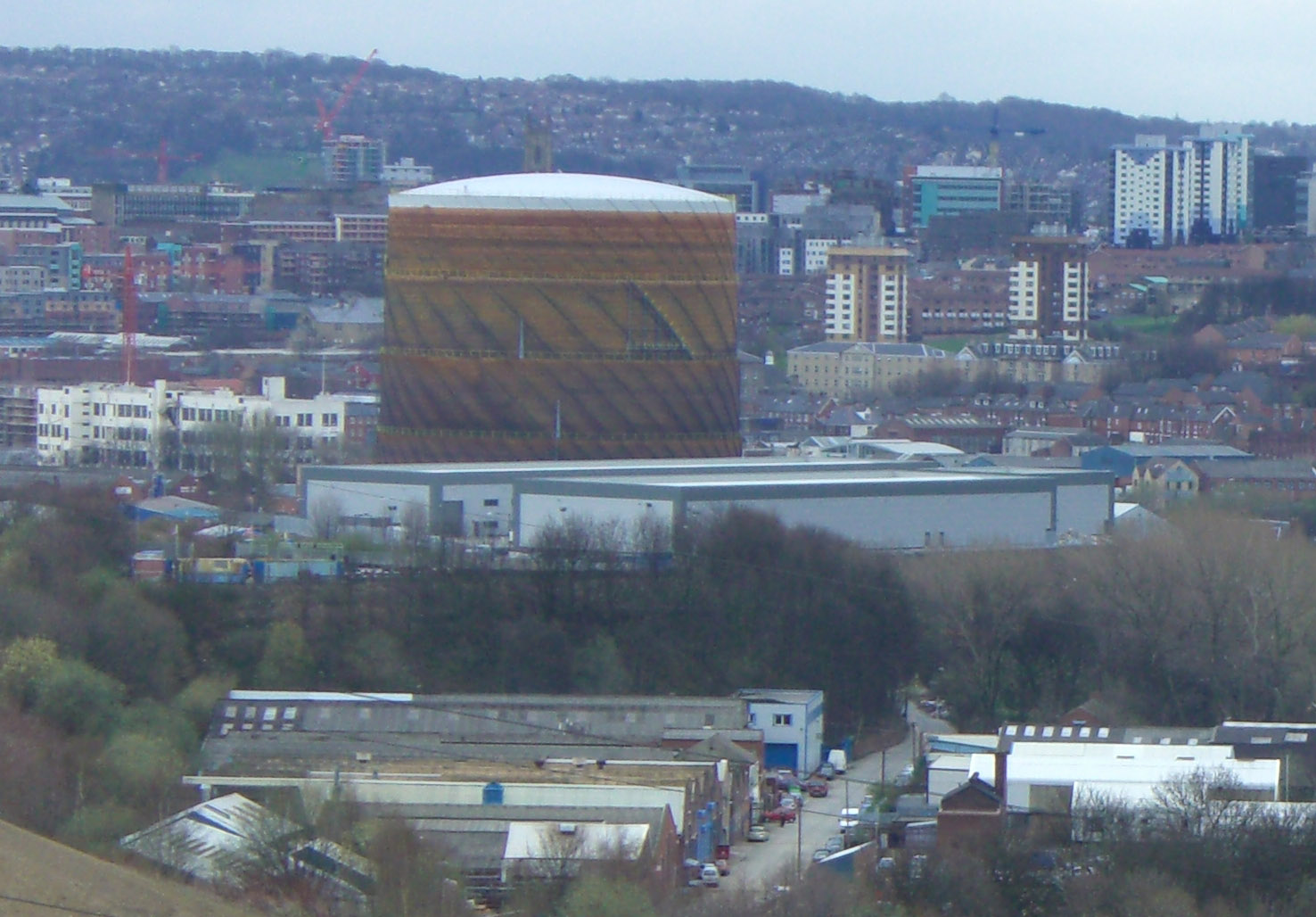
The Neepsend gas holder dominated the district and was a prominent landmark across Sheffield.

The 18th century brought the first industrial development to the area, when the Sandbed Wheel of the Sandbed Tilt Company was constructed on the Don just upstream from Hillfoot Bridge. Further development continued when the Neepsend Tannery was opened in 1821, the 1853 OS map showing the Neepsend Tavern and a brewery on Rutland Road. The adjacent Kelham Island district was one of Sheffield's most important early industrial areas; it now houses the Kelham Island Museum. With a population explosion in Sheffield, Neepsend was radically changed in the second half of the 19th century. In 1852, Neepsend Gas Works, one of the area's most famous landmarks, was built by the newly formed Gas Consumers Company.

The neighbouring district of Owlerton was supplied with gas by the rival Sheffield United Gas Light Company, and eventually an amalgamation solved any problems between the two companies. The Neepsend Rolling Mills were established in 1876, just downstream from Neepsend Bridge, and produced crucible steel for the cutlery industry. After being demolished, it was the subject of an archaeological dig in 2003 before apartments were built on the site. Other industrial heritage buildings in the area are the Globe Works and Cornish Place, which have been converted into offices and apartments respectively while the Green Lane Works are at present disused.

In December 1845, the Sheffield, Ashton-Under-Lyne and Manchester Railway opened, and Neepsend was a key point on the line with Neepsend engine shed being built to supply and overhaul locomotives for the nearby Sheffield Victoria railway station. The Neepsend shed even built a number of locomotives for the line. The Parkwood Springs district was developed as a housing area in the 1860s for railway employees, and, in 1888, the Neepsend railway station was opened. The station closed to passengers in 1940.

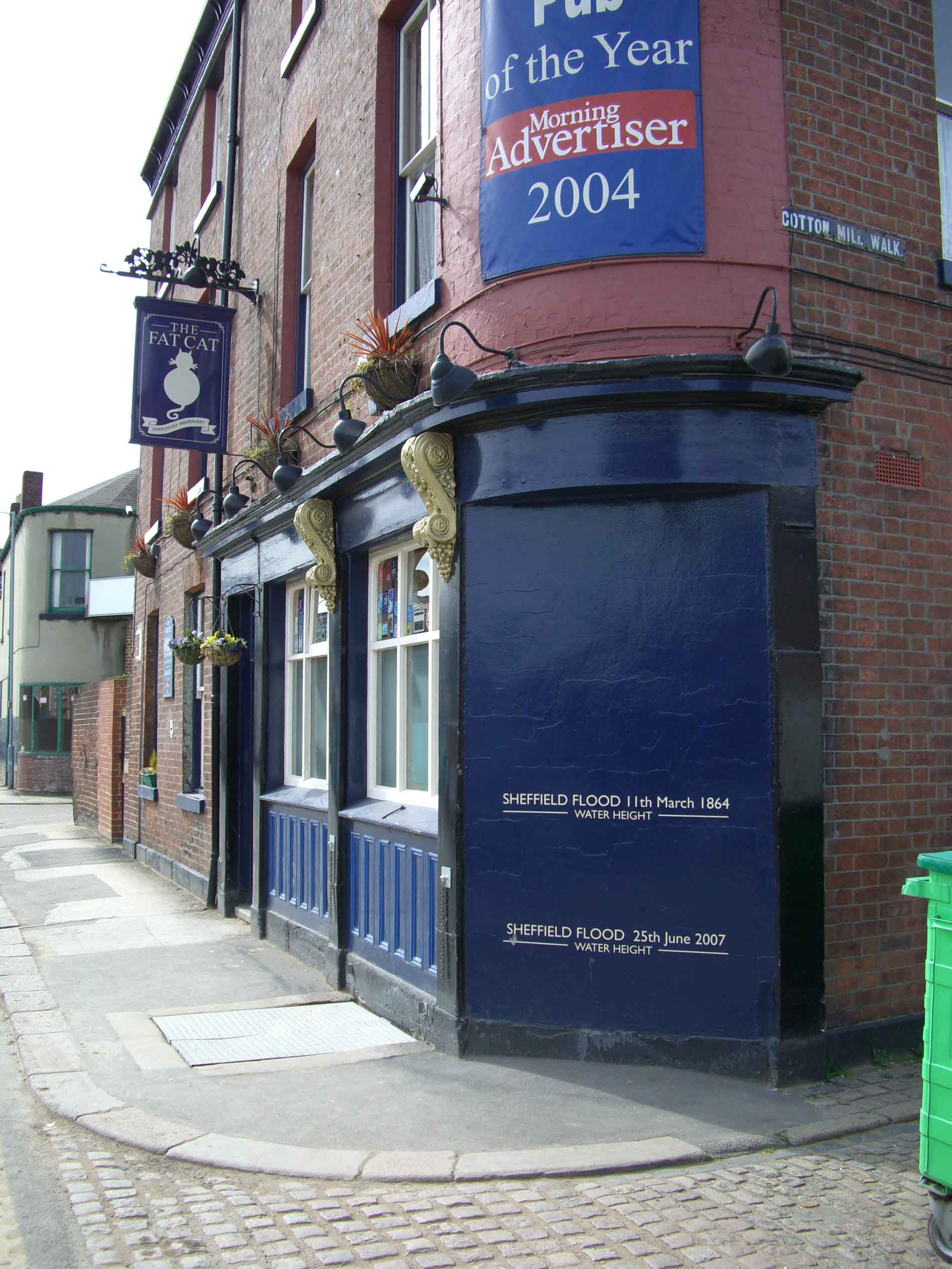
The Fat Cat pub showing the relative heights of the 1864 and 2007 floods.

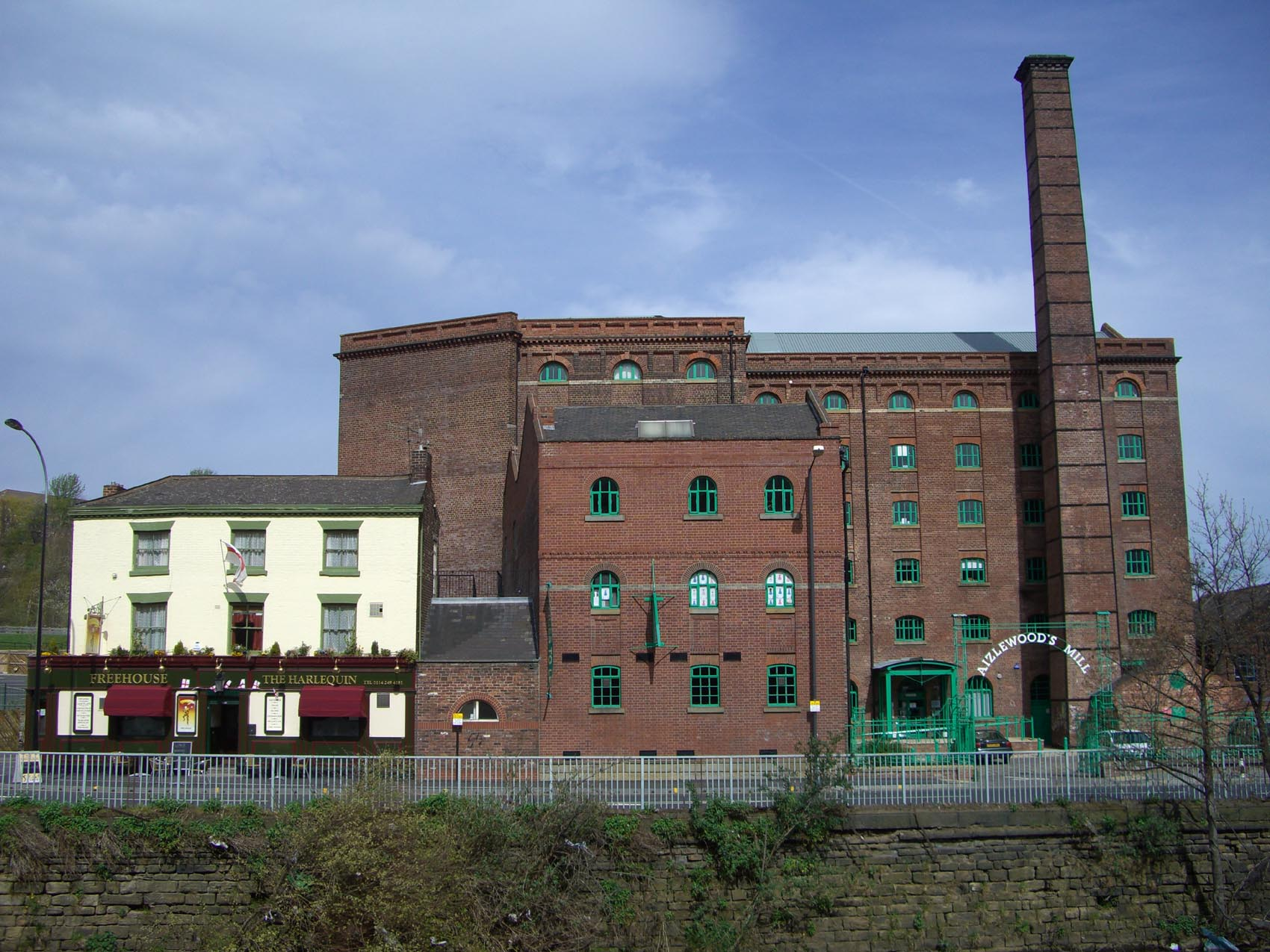
Aizlewood's Mill with the Harlequin pub next door.

=== Sheffield flood ===
The Great Sheffield Flood devastated the Neepsend area on 12 March 1864, killing approximately 77 people in the deluge. The whole locality was more or less flooded. The gas works suffered substantial damage losing more than 1,000 tons of coal as well as boilers and engines. Many of the industrial mills on the River Don were badly damaged and all the boundary walls by the river were swept away. The Neepsend Bridge managed to withstand the onslaught although a large amount of debris was piled up against it. Hillfoot Bridge, then made of timber, was swept away and later replaced by a stone structure.

=== 20th century ===
The 20th century brought the opening of the Neepsend Power Station, erected on the site of the Old Parkwood brick works in 1902. It was ideally situated on the banks of the Don where water could be used for condensing purposes and close to the railway station which supplied coal. The power station was expanded on several occasions, a cooling tower was added in 1937 and a second in 1947. It became obsolete and was decommissioned in 1976 when the CEGBs newer stations on the River Trent started to feed the national grid. The vertical boiler tank engine Neepsend, which spent its entire life working at the power station, is preserved at the Great Central Railway, where it is awaiting restoration into working order. In 1905 the electric Sheffield Tramway route between the city centre and Owlerton opened and passed through Neepsend, going along Neepsend Lane.

The last remnants of the Old Park Wood were felled for firewood during the General Strike of 1926. The Parkwood Ganister and Coal Mine operated between 1938 and 1963, the coal being sold to the power station and the ganister to make fire bricks.

Neepsend suffered damage from air raids in 1940 during the Second World War; the gas works was severely damaged as three million cubic feet of gas stored in four gas holders was ignited. Neepsend Lane was badly damaged by bombing and the main gas main hit; nine cottages were destroyed by a large bomb in Parkwood Road. The gas works reopened in 1943 after the bombing, but today gas is no longer produced at the works although the largest of the holders is still standing and is used to store North Sea gas.

=== Post war ===
After the Second World War the resident population was greatly reduced, resulting in Boyland Street School closing in 1946 and Neepsend Hillfoot School closing in 1975.

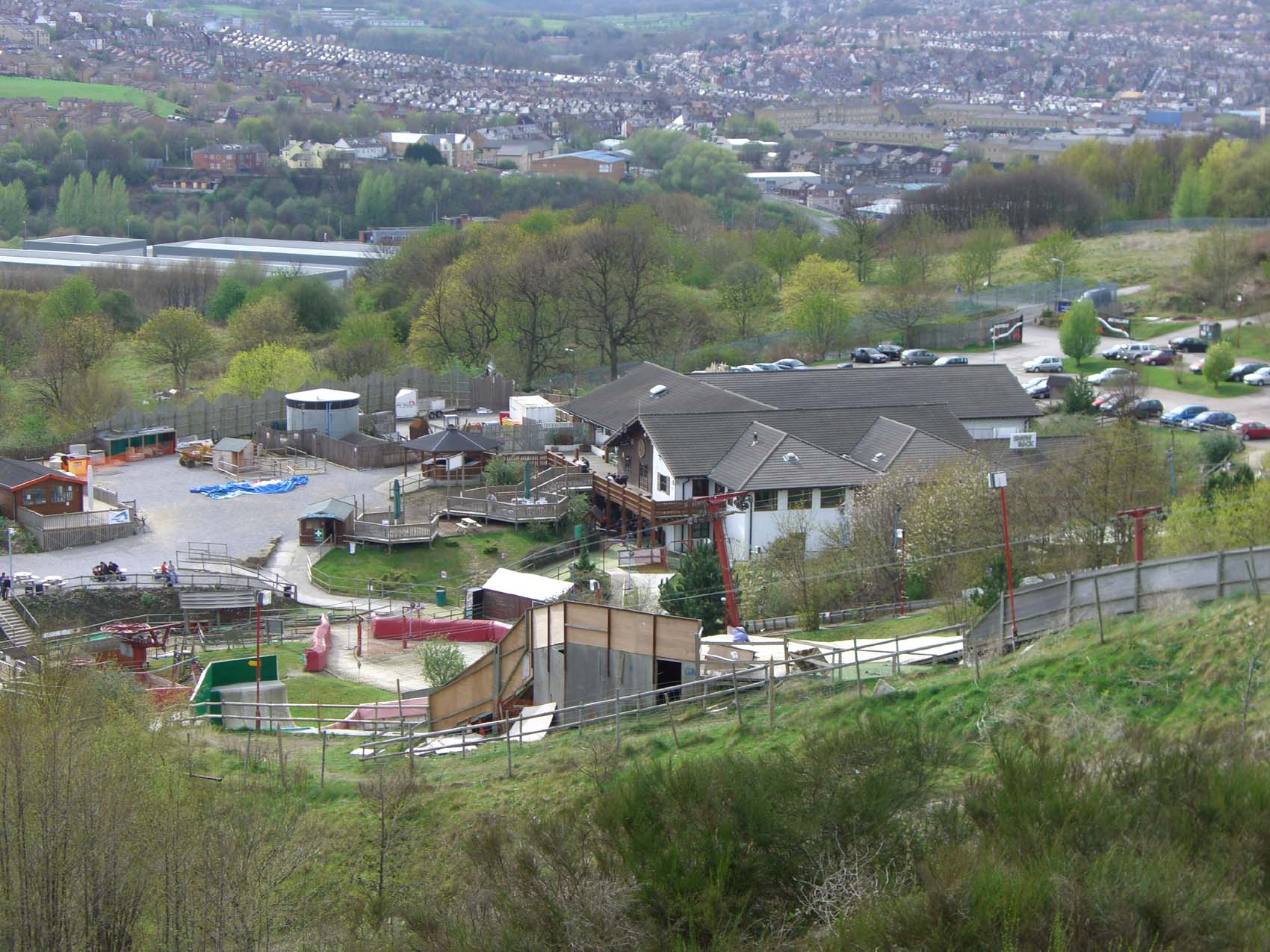
The now closed Sheffield Ski Village occupied the former site of the Parkwood Springs estate.

In 1978 the Parkwood Springs estate was bulldozed and then landscaped, in 1988 the Sheffield Ski Village was opened on the site. The village included eight ski runs, ski lodge, retail shops and restaurants. The Ski Village closed on 29 April 2012 when the main building was destroyed by a fire. On 28 November 2017 it was announced that developers wanted to rebuild on the site, and redevelop a £22.5 million sports centre.

The South Yorkshire Supertram network opened in stages from 1994, with Shalesmoor tram stop tram stop opening on the Blue and Yellow routes in 1995; as part of the regeneration of the area, the tram stop was renamed to Shalesmoor for Kelham Island in the 2010s.

In June 2007, the area was badly flooded when the River Don burst its banks. Many businesses and properties were affected. September 2012 saw the completion of new flood defences between Nursery Street and the River Don, the work costing £680,000 incorporates a pocket park into the design. The park has stepped levels sloping down to the river, which are designed to hold back any overflow. In October 2017 a small mammal survey carried out by the Sorby Natural History Society found that the Parkwood Springs area was home to bank voles and wood mice.

The Neepsend area, and in particular the old Gasworks site, is the main focus of the University of Sheffield's Integrated Design Project for third year civil and structural engineering students. It is also the focus of the University's Multi-disciplinary Design Project for final year civil engineering, mechanical engineering, architecture and landscape architecture students.

== Landmarks ==
The Green Lane Works (Grade II* listed), Cornish Place Works and the Brooklyn Works (Grade II listed) are important industrial heritage sites. Aizlewood's mill is a grade two listed building and is a former six storey flour mill built in 1861 and it is on Nursery Street, close to the city centre. The derelict building was restored and opened as a business centre in 1990. The other building have also been converted away from industrial use.

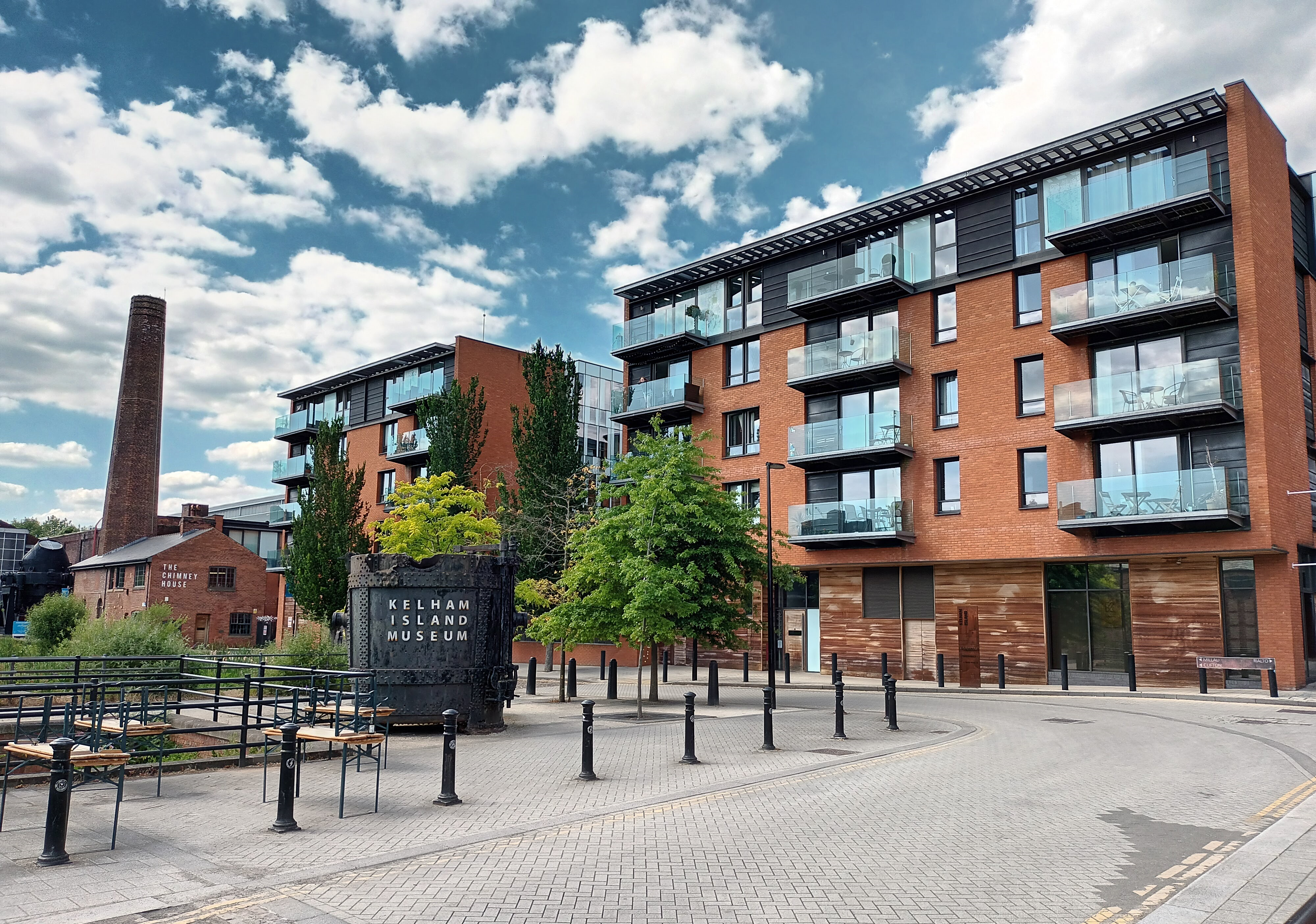
Kelham Island Museum (left) and apartments (right).

The area is home to an industrial museum, the Kelham Island Museum, including the famous River Don Engine. The once had Sheffield's last traditional hand-made scissor makers, Ernest Wright and Son Limited, until their relocation to premises closer to the city centre in 2011.

Yellow Arch Studios, a music recording studio on Burton Road, well known artists such as the Arctic Monkeys, Richard Hawley and Jarvis Cocker have all used the facilities at the studios, with Hawley and Cocker both recording albums there.

The New Testament Church of God, also on Nursery Street, is a Grade II listed building built by Flockton, Lee & Flockton it was financed by Anne and Elizabeth Harrison, who stipulated that it should be an exact copy of Christ Church in Attercliffe (1826) and therefore has an old-fashioned look with thin pointed buttresses, a crenellated parapet and a square tower.

Neepsend has many public houses; the Gardeners Rest, the Forest, The Harlequin, Tye Chimney House, The Wellington, the Ship Inn, The Riverside, The Fat Cat, The Kelham Island Tavern and The Milestone. The area is home to the Kelham Island Brewery.

=== Kelham Island ===
Kelham Island was created by the building of a goit (mill race) fed from the River Don to serve the water wheels powering the workshops of the areas' now former industry.

Images of the Kelham Island Quarter
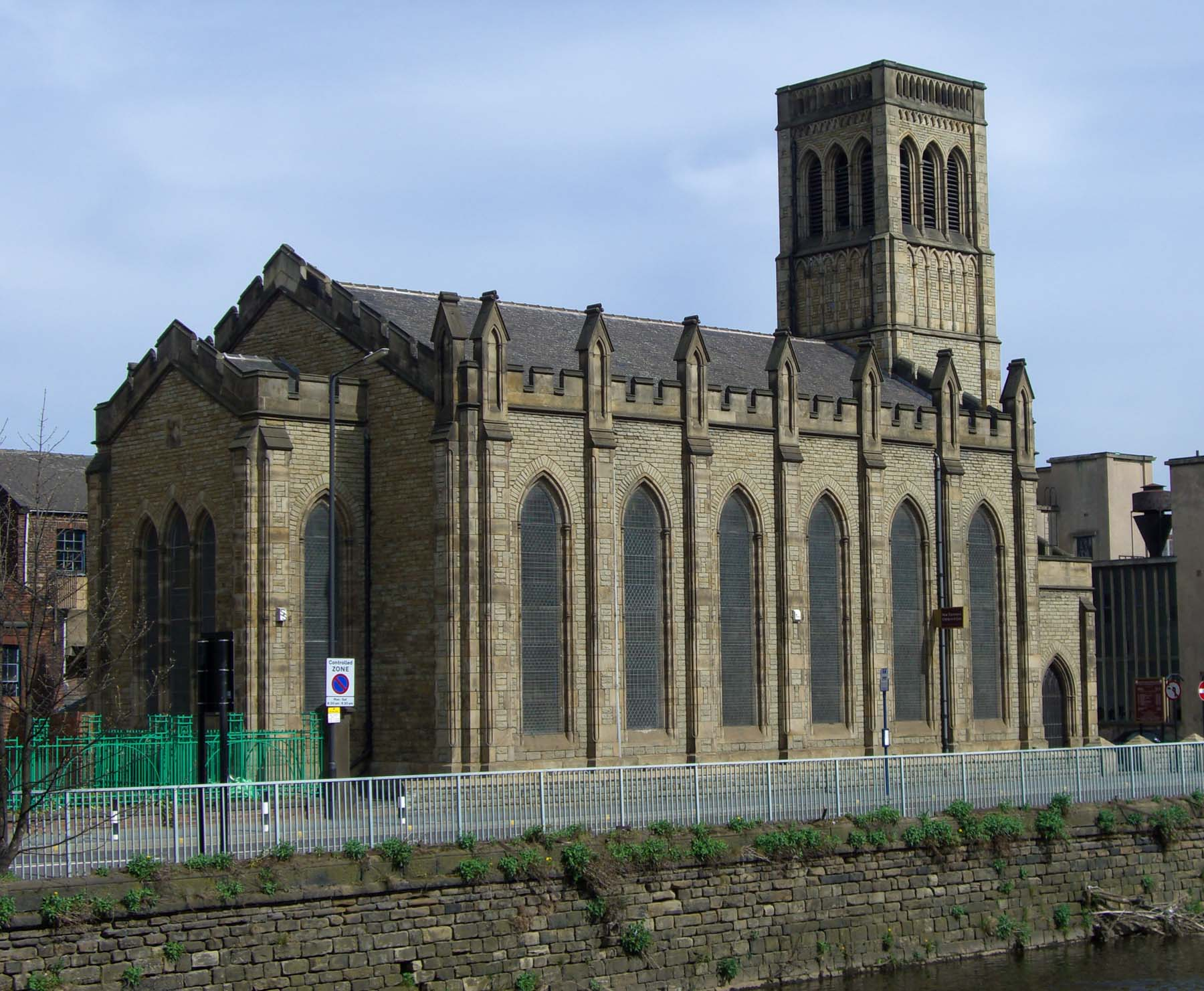
New Testament Church Of God on Nursery Street

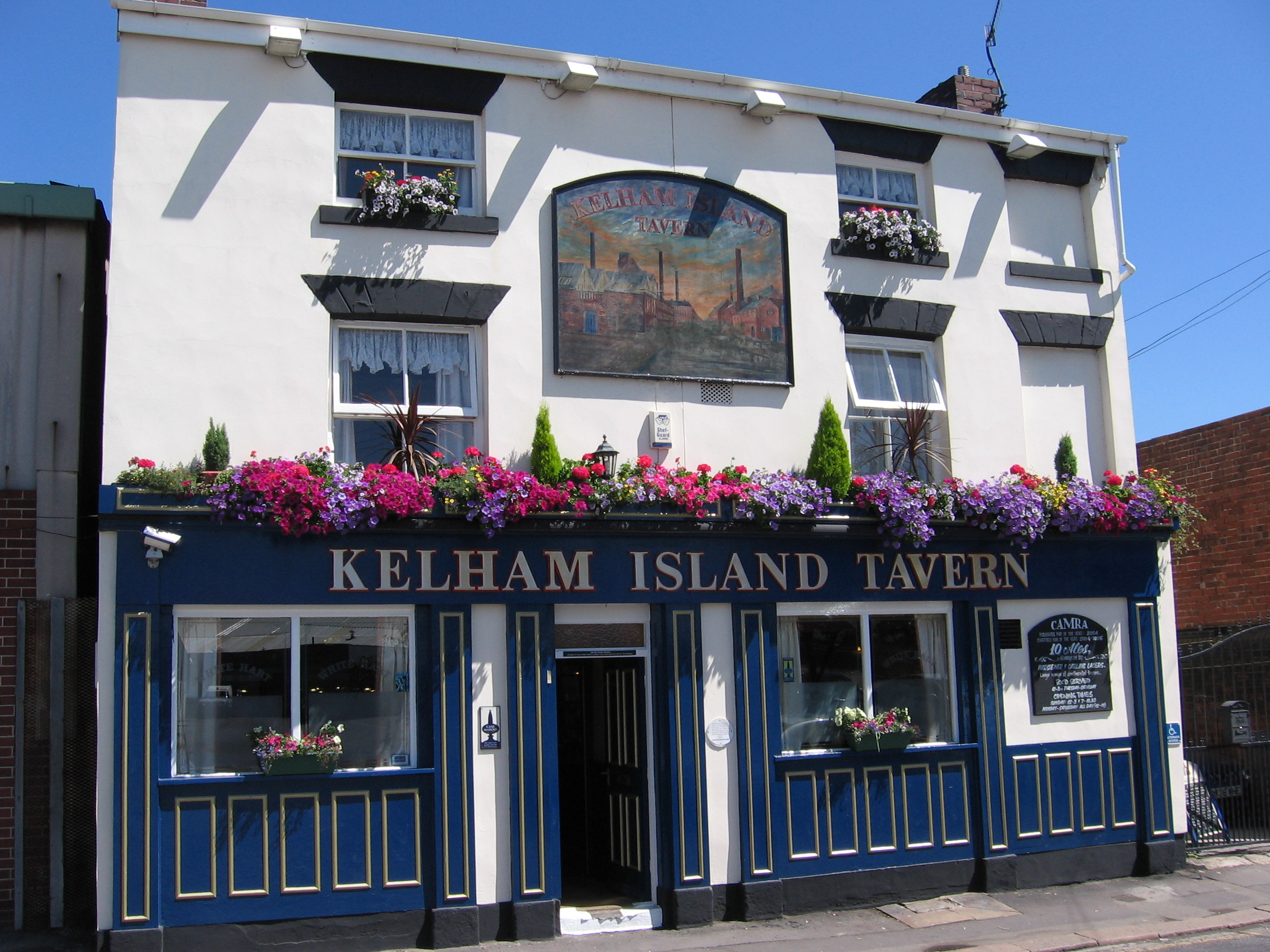
Kelham Island Tavern

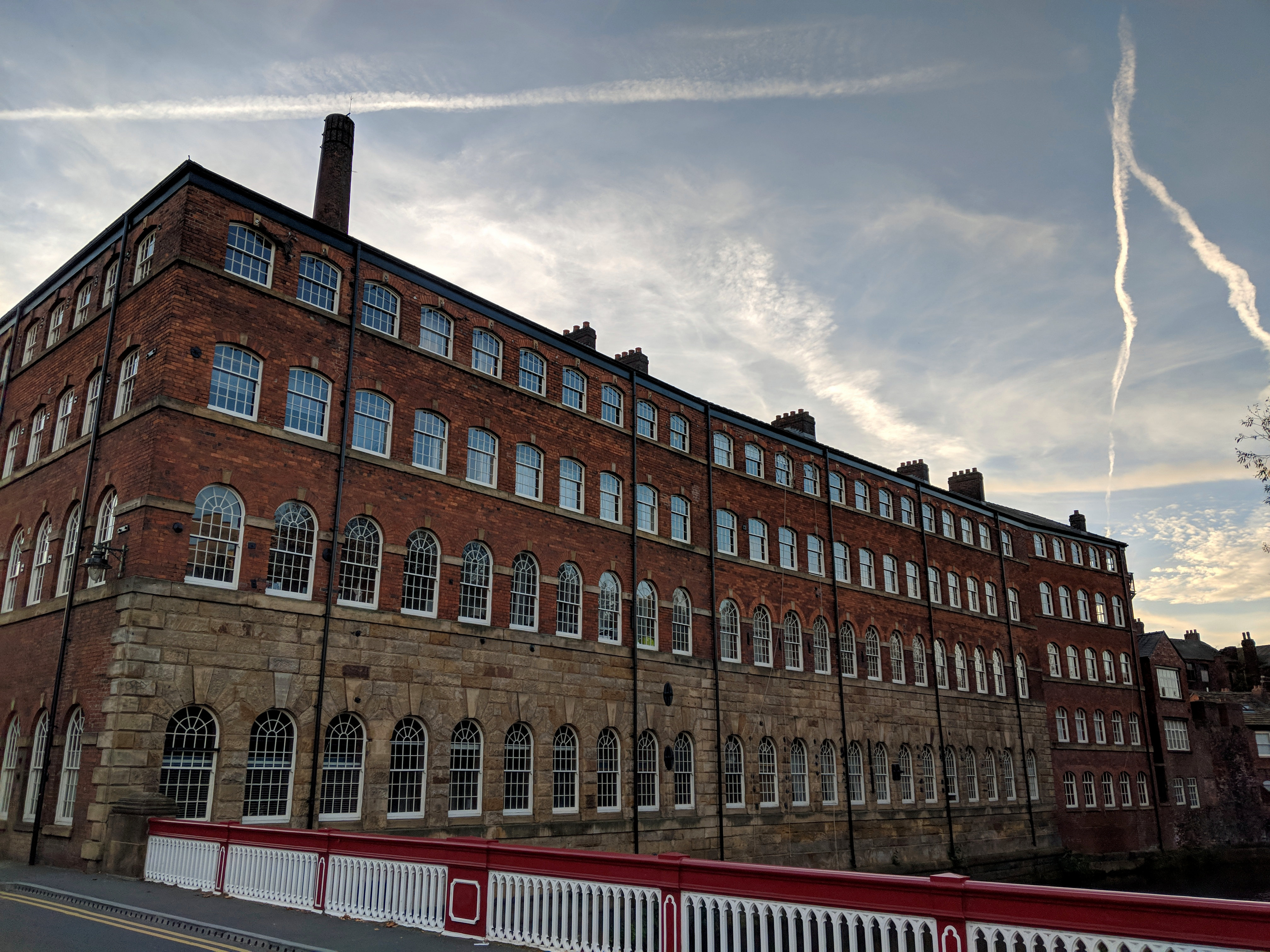
Cornish Place Works

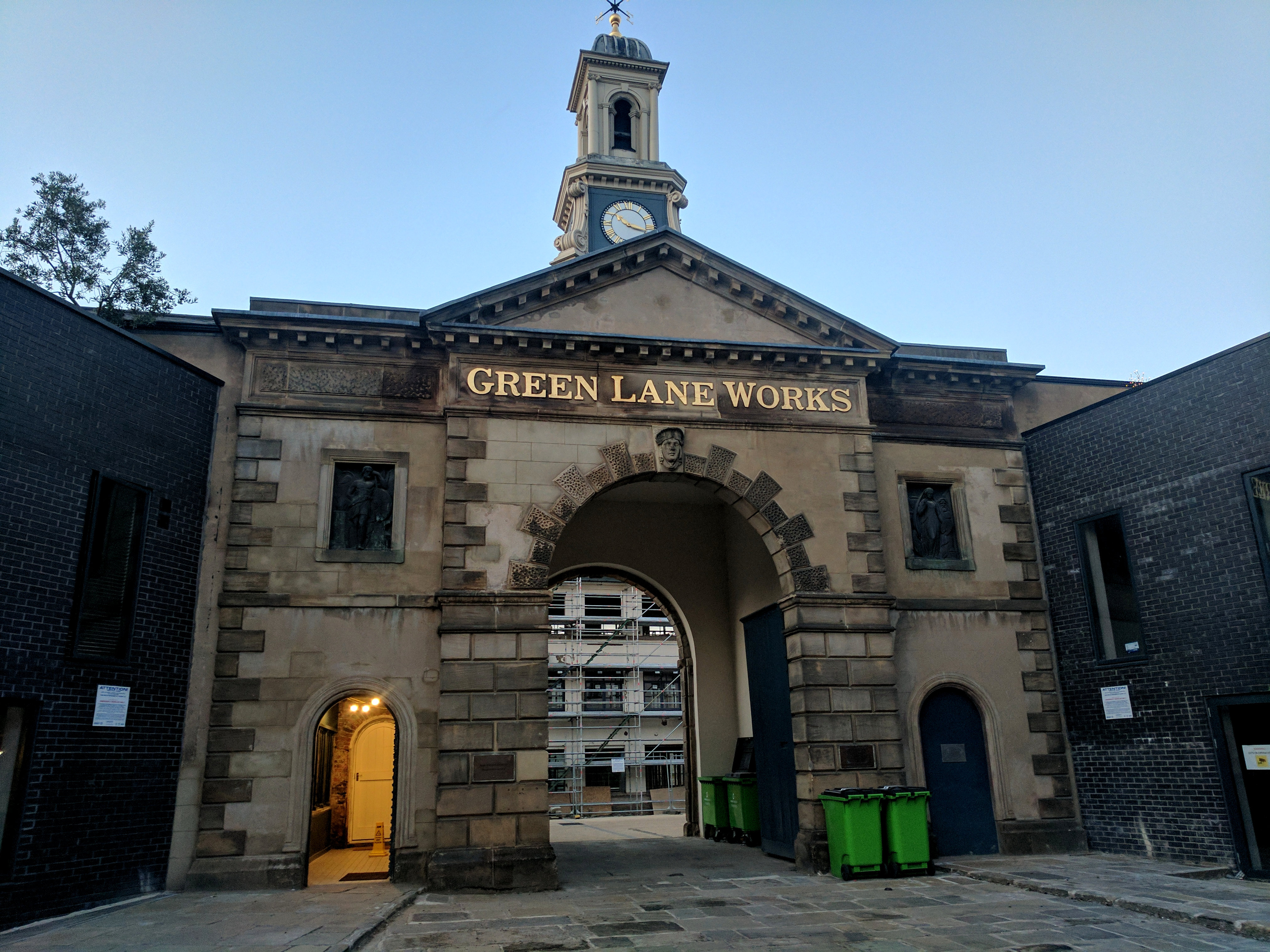
Green Lane Works
