= Green Lane Works =

Building in Sheffield, South Yorkshire, England

Coordinates: 53.3895°N 1.4748°W

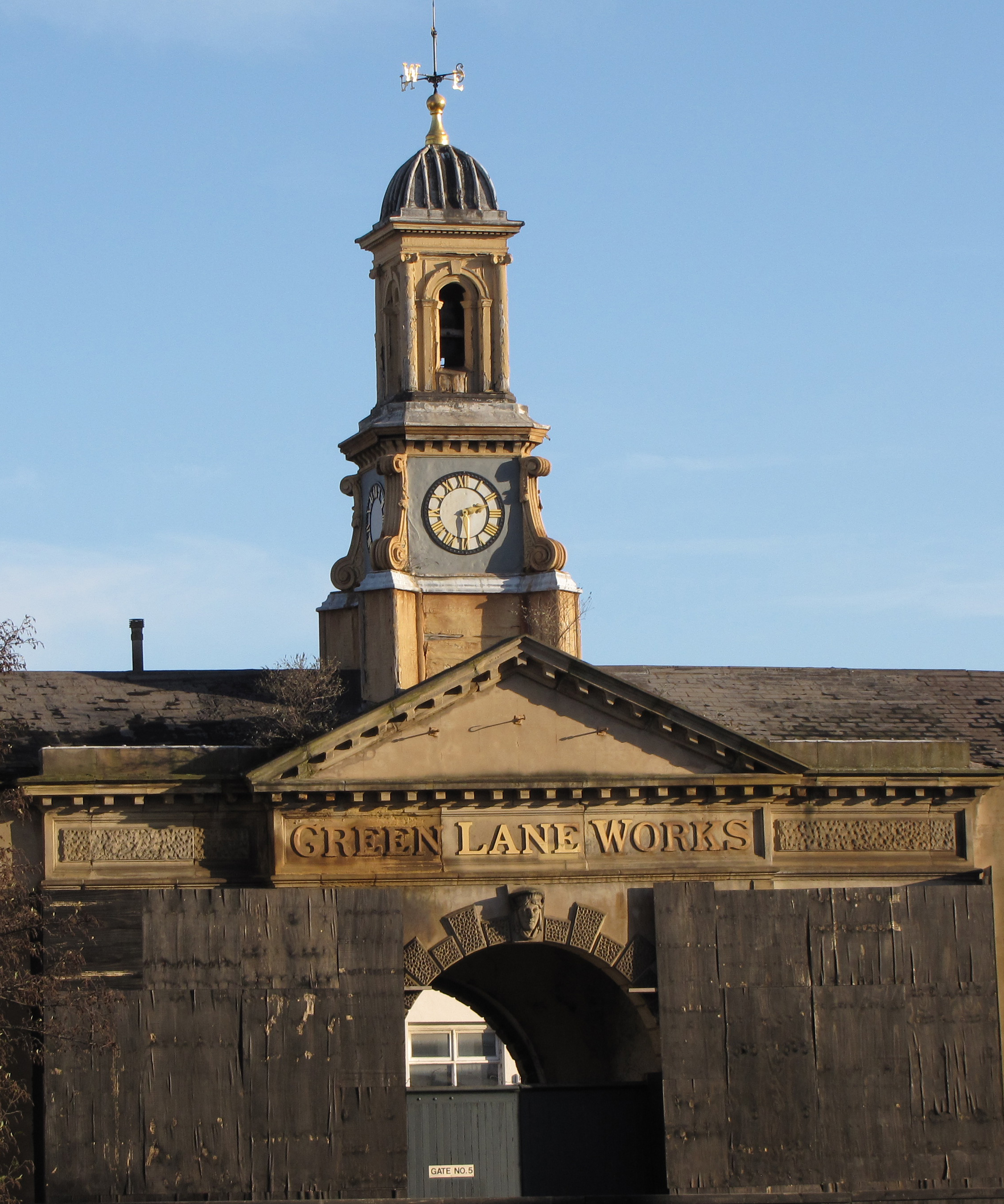
The entrance gateway is partly boarded for protection in 2009.

The entrance gateway in the early 1860s just after being built.

The Green Lane Works are a disused industrial facility situated in the City of Sheffield, England. The entrance gate to the works is particularly ornate and has been designated as a Grade II* listed building. Nikolaus Pevsner called the gate “the most spectacular survival of factory architecture in the city”. The works are situated in the suburb of Neepsend within the Kelham Island Quarter of the city and date from 1795 although there were extensive alterations in 1860.

== History ==
The original Green Lane Works were established in 1795 by the firm of Hoole and Company who were manufacturers of ornamental stove grates and fenders in Bronze and metal. The firm flourished and their products won a first Council medal at The Great Exhibition of 1851 and a Medaille d'honneur at the Exposition Universelle of 1855. This success brought considerable prestige to the firm and its proprietor at the time Henry E. Hoole. In 1859 Hoole was elected Lord Mayor of Sheffield and to celebrate this he had major alterations carried out to the works.

=== Entrance gateway ===
The most important part of the 1860 rebuilding was the construction of the decorative entrance arch on Green Lane. It is thought that the sculptor Alfred Stevens designed the gatehouse and may have been responsible for the relief sculptured decoration. Stevens had worked for Hoole and Company between 1850 and 1852 as chief designer on a salary of £20 per annum and had designed much of the firms award winning work for the 1851 exhibition. When he returned to London after two years with Hooles he left behind him many drawings and designs for apprentices to study.

The Gateway is constructed of ashlar, stucco and brick and takes the form of a tripartite triumphal arch with a carving of a female head on the keystone above the main (central) arch. The two outer (pedestrian) arches have relief panels of the Greek gods Hephaestus (left) and Athena (right) above them. The name of the works is carved above the central arch and above this is an apex roof which at one time had a coat of arms on it which is now missing. The gateway is topped off by a cupola with clock and weather vane.

=== Later history ===
The works were considerably damaged in the Great Sheffield Flood of March 1864 with Samuel Harrison in his A Complete History of the Great Sheffield Flood saying:

The Green Lane Works, the property of Messrs. H. E. Hoole and Co., were damaged considerably. A large room, filled with stoves, fenders, and so forth, was flooded to a depth of four feet. Trunks of trees were washed into the grinding wheel, the engine and boiler were covered with debris, and a great quantity of miscellaneous property was destroyed.

The works continued to make stove grates and fenders until 1930, up until 1948 it produced files as part of the Ibbotson Brothers group. In April 1948 the works were purchased by W.A. Tyzack who produced agricultural tools and parts for farm machinery.

In late 2009, the works was disused with its future unknown. The gateway was partly boarded up to protect it from vandalism. In 2013, the works was added to the Heritage at Risk Register. In 2015, it was removed from the register following repairs. As of 2018, it has been converted in four commercial spaces as part of the Little Kelham development. The spaces range from 1,349 square feet (125 m^{2}) to 1,649 square feet (153 m^{2}) and were for sale, leasehold, at prices from £249,514 to £305,073.
