= Cornish Place =

Building in Sheffield, Yorkshire, England

Coordinates: 53.3901°N 1.4766°W

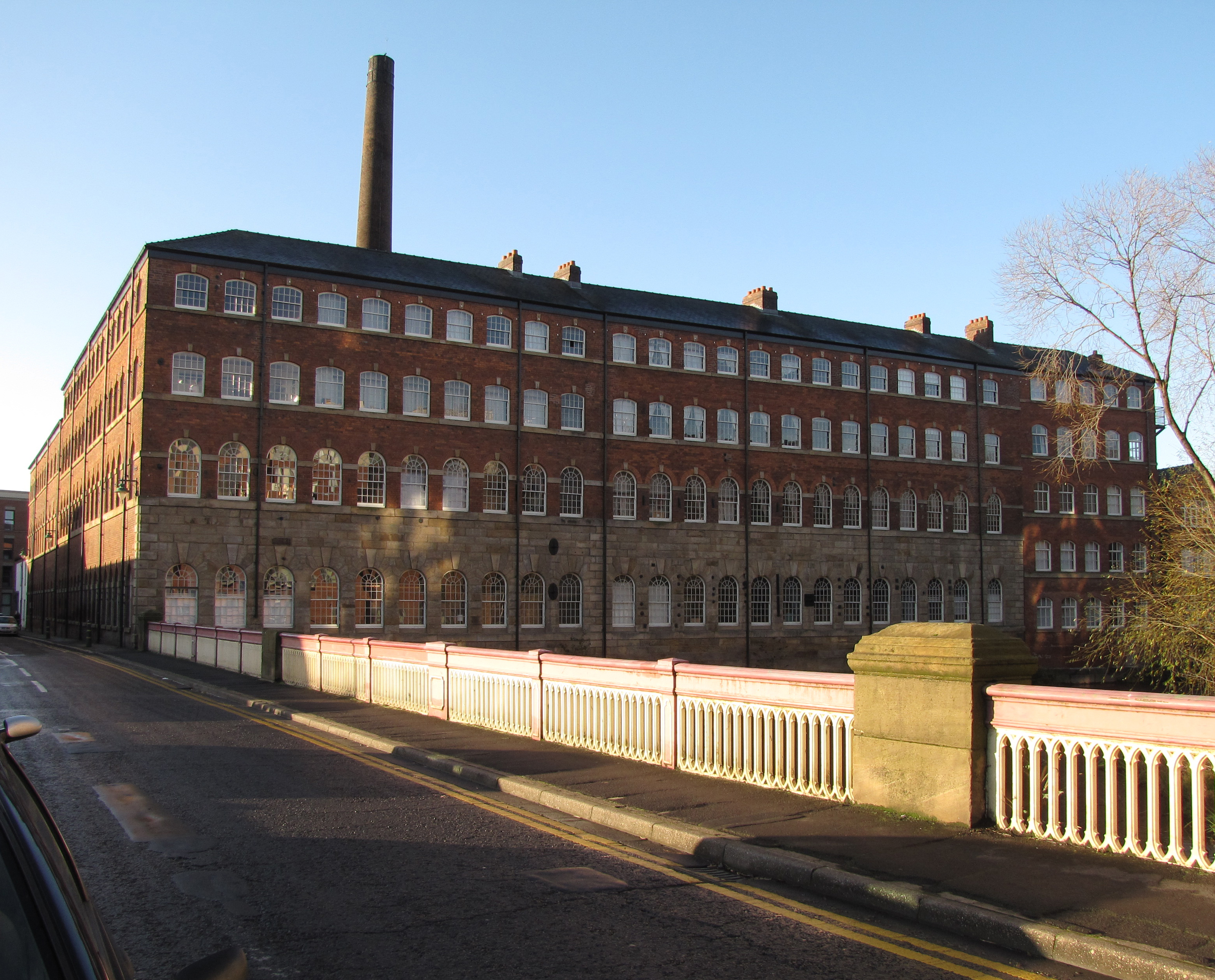
The east range of the works seen from the Ball Street bridge over the River Don.

Cornish Place is a listed building situated in the Neepsend area of the City of Sheffield. The building was formerly the factory of James Dixon & Sons, a Britannia metal, Sheffield plate and Cutlery manufacturer. In the late 1990s the disused building was cleaned and converted into apartments, it is regarded as the most impressive cutlery works that still stands in Sheffield and rivals the cotton mills of Lancashire and the West Riding in terms of architectural quality and heritage. The east and west ranges of the structure are the most spectacular, with Grade II* listed classification, while the rest of the works receive the lower Grade II category. The "Cornish" in the buildings name is thought to derive from the manufacture of Britannia metal which is made up of 93% tin which came from Cornwall.

== History ==
An engraving of Cornish Place in the early 1860s.

=== Foundation ===
The firm was founded as Dixon & Smith in 1805 and was based on Silver Street in the centre of Sheffield. James Dixon’s association with the Cornish Place site began in 1819 when a rolling mill on the spot came into the possession of Dixon & Smith. In 1822 Dixon set up business on his own and the rolling mill was converted into a workshop for the manufacture of silver and plated goods. During the 1830s the firm acquired land to the south of the original buildings and new workshops were constructed. The first phase of the works were a U-shaped series of buildings which fronted onto Cornish Street and the River Don and consisted of workshops, casting shops and offices.

=== Expansion ===
The works were extended as the firm became more successful with the more notable part of the building, the east range, being built between 1851 and 1854 when the works were being converted to steam power. The completion of the enclosure of the inner courtyard involved the construction of a range, forming an L shape with its long side facing Ball Street and its short side adjacent to the River Don, connecting with older workshops. Additional building work occurred between 1857 and 1859, resulting in the addition of warehouses and a showroom at the southern end of Ball Street. Around 1860, the west range was built, featuring more decorative architecture and prominently displaying the name of the works on the parapet, as it faced Green Lane. By the 1860s, the works spanned approximately four acres and employed over 700 people.

=== Peak, decline and closure ===
The firm reached its peak in 1914 as Dixon’s sons and grandsons expanded the business, selling goods throughout America and the Empire. At that time between 900 and 1000 people were employed at the works. Up until World War I Cornish Place was powered by steam power with a steam engine situated in the engine house which had a 135 feet high chimney on top (the chimney still stands today). Electrification of the works began during World War I although it was some time before steam power was not needed. Another effect of World War I was a reduction in demand for luxury products which hit the firm badly and from which they would never recover.

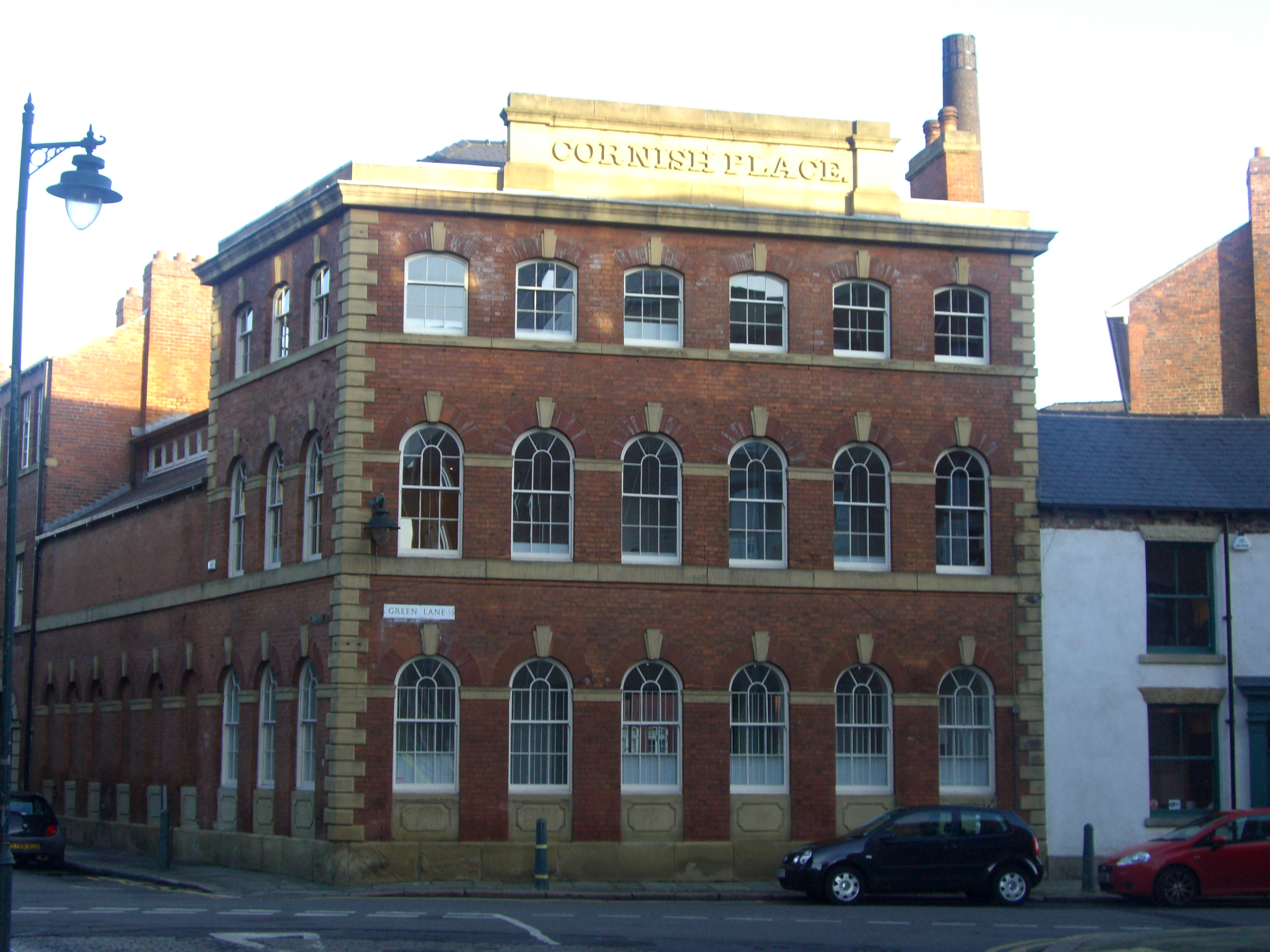
The west range on Green Lane.

Competition from Japan in the production of cutlery was also a blow to Dixons, by the 1970s the firm was making regular annual losses and by 1982 had virtually collapsed with debts of over £1,000,000. At that time there were only 57 employees and parts of Cornish Place were let out to other businesses. A re-launch of the firm was attempted in 1984 with 30 employees but this was short-lived and Dixons was eventually absorbed into the Sheffield-based firm British Silverware. Production continued at Cornish Place until 1992 when the building closed.

=== Present day ===
In 1998 the disused Cornish Place was converted into apartments by the Sheffield-based architects Axis Architecture with construction work done by Gleesons.

== Architecture ==
The east range which fronts onto Ball Street and the River Don is constructed from ashlar and brick with ashlar dressings and a Gablet roof made from slate and asbestos cement. There are four floors with the ground and first floor having attractive arched windows. The ground floor was made to be fireproof with extensive use of cast iron. The west range on Green Lane is brick built with ashlar dressing and decorative arched windows. The adjoining plating shop has distinctive large windows with clerestories above.
