= Cobweb Bridge =

Bridge in Sheffield, South Yorkshire, England

Coordinates: 53°23′16.7″N 1°27′36.1″W

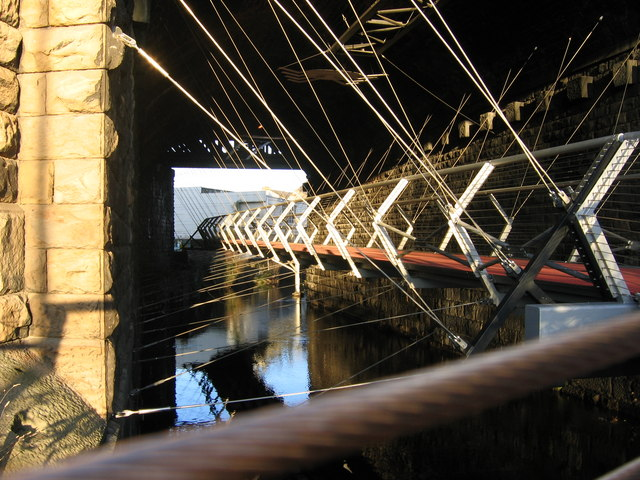
Cobweb Bridge forms part of the Five Weirs Walk along the River Don from Blonk Street, near the centre of Sheffield, eastwards to Meadowhall. The bridge is held in place by a lattice-work of suspension and tensioning cables and sits over the waters of the Don and below the railway arches of the old Victoria Station, now long gone.

The Cobweb Bridge, also known as Spider Bridge, is located in the city centre of Sheffield, South Yorkshire, England, near the disused Sheffield Victoria railway station. Completed in 2002, its design solves a difficult problem: passing the riverside cycle- and footpath (the Five Weirs Walk) under the massive Wicker Arches viaduct while linking one bank of the River Don to the other. Without the Cobweb Bridge, the footpath would have had to make a one-mile detour.

Designed by Sheffield City Council's Structures Section, the entire 330-foot (100 m) long bridge is suspended on a web of steel cables secured to the underside of the viaduct, hence the name. Completing the theme, large steel likenesses of spiders conceal the overhead lighting.

While the bridge has been prone to vandalism in the past (the wires forming the parapet having been stolen more than once), the bridge was repaired in 2015 to reduce the risk of future vandalism. The newly restored bridge no longer uses wires in the parapet, having been replaced with metal plates with spiderweb designs.

== See also ==
- List of bridges in the United Kingdom
