= River Don, Yorkshire =

River in South Yorkshire and the East Riding of Yorkshire, England

River Don
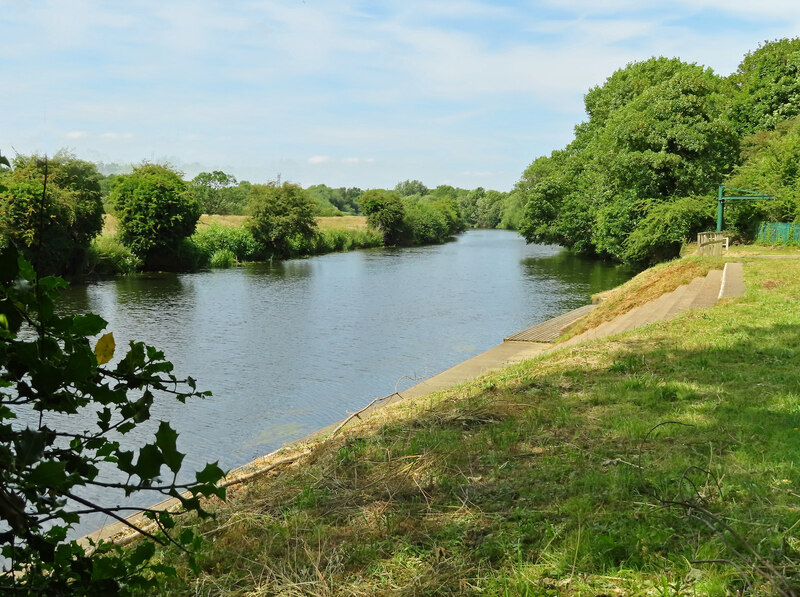
- River Don near Sprotbrough, Doncaster

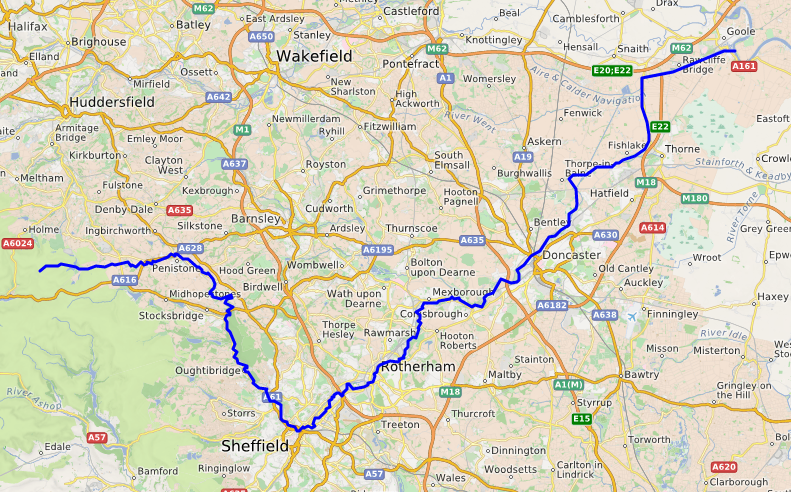

Location
- Country: England

Physical characteristics
- Source
  - location: Pennines
  - coordinates: 53.519°N 1.762°W
- Mouth
  - location: River Trent/River Ouse
  - coordinates: 53.697°N 0.867°W
- Length: 69 mi (111 km)

The River Don (also called River Dun in some stretches) is a river in South Yorkshire and the East Riding of Yorkshire, England. It rises in the Pennines, west of Dunford Bridge, and flows for 69 miles (111 km) eastwards, through the Don Valley, via Penistone, Sheffield, Rotherham, Mexborough, Conisbrough, Doncaster and Stainforth. It originally joined the Trent, but was re-engineered by Cornelius Vermuyden as the Dutch River in the 1620s, and now joins the River Ouse at Goole. Don Valley is a UK parliamentary constituency near the Doncaster stretch of the river.

== Etymology ==
The probable origin of the name was Brittonic Dānā, from a root dān-, meaning "water" or "river". The name Dôn (or Danu), a Celtic mother goddess, has the same origin.

The river gave its name to the Don River, one of the principal rivers of Toronto, Ontario, Canada.

== Geography ==
The Don can be divided into sections by the different types of structures built to restrict its passage. The upper reaches, and those of several of its tributaries, are defined by dams built to provide a public water supply. The middle section contains many weirs, which were built to supply mills, foundries and factories with water power, while the lower section contains weirs and locks, designed to maintain water levels for navigation. The Don's major tributaries are the Loxley, the Rivelin, the Sheaf, the Rother and the Dearne.

Along the Sheffield–Rotherham stretch of the river are five weirs that punctuate a local walking and cycling route, the Five Weirs Walk. A further walk, the Upper Don Walk, is being developed that will make it possible to walk or cycle from Sheffield city centre up to Oughtibridge.

== History ==
Below Doncaster, the main channel of the lower Don originally meandered in a north-easterly direction across the marshland of Hatfield Chase to enter the Trent just above its junction with the Ouse. A second channel flowed to the north, along a Roman channel called Turnbridgedike. The eastern channel formed the boundary between Yorkshire and Lincolnshire.

In the Hatfield Level drainage project which started in 1626, the Dutch civil engineer Cornelius Vermuyden diverted the Don northwards along Turnbridgedike. He constructed Dikesmarsh bank some distance to the east of the channel, so that the intervening land could be used as washlands. The main work was completed by 1628, but after flooding in 1629, a "Great Sluice" was constructed at the junction between the river and the Aire, with 17 openings which were 6 by 8 feet (1.8 by 2.4 m), probably by Hugo Spiering, who had assisted Vermuyden on the main project. The washlands had insufficient capacity, and in 1632 work started on a new channel, which would run for 5 miles (8.0 km) from Newbridge, near Thorne, eastwards to enter the Ouse at the site of Goole, 9 miles (14 km) upstream of the Trent. Water levels here were between 5 and 10 feet (1.5 and 3.0 m) lower than at Turnbridge. This new channel was called the "Dutch River", and was finished in 1635, at a cost of £33,000. It ended in a sluice at Goole, and was never intended to be navigable, as boats could access the Aire at Turnbridge. The sluice was later swept away in a flood and never replaced.

The Dutch River was difficult to navigate, made more hazardous by shoals, three awkward bridges, and low water levels at neap tides. With the opening of the Stainforth and Keadby Canal in 1802, from the Don at Stainforth to the Trent at Keadby, most traffic for the Trent used that in preference to the Dutch River and the route around Trent Falls, where the Trent joins the Humber. Construction of a railway from Doncaster to Goole in 1869 reduced traffic on the river, but the Sheffield and South Yorkshire Navigation Company was formed in 1889, to buy back the River Don Navigation, the Sheffield Canal and the Stainforth and Keadby Canal from railway ownership, to keep them competitive. They acquired the waterways in 1895, but failed to raise sufficient capital for the major improvements they had planned. However, they succeeded in constructing the New Junction Canal from Stainforth to the Aire and Calder Navigation (Knottingley and Goole Canal) west of Goole, which was jointly funded by the Aire and Calder, and opened in 1905. The Dutch River reverted almost entirely to its original drainage function, and Stainforth lock, which connected it to the Stainforth and Keadby Canal, was closed in 1939.

=== Navigation ===
Navigation to Sheffield was made possible by the construction of weirs, locks and canal cuttings to avoid circuitous and unnavigable sections of the Don downstream of Tinsley, and then by a canal from Tinsley to Sheffield. The first serious attempts at improvements were authorised by an act of Parliament, the River Dun Navigation Act 1725 (12 Geo. 1. c. 38) obtained in 1726 by Sheffield's Company of Cutlers to make the river navigable from Holmstile in Doncaster to Tinsley, on the edge of Sheffield, and another obtained by the Corporation of Doncaster in 1727 to improve the river below Holmstile, as far as Wilsick House in Barnby Dun. An act of Parliament of 1733, the River Dun Navigation Act 1732 (6 Geo. 2. c. 9), created "The Company of the Proprietors of the Navigation of the River Don", and authorised further cuts above Rotherham, while a further bill of 1740 sought powers to improve the river from Barnby Dun to Fishlake Ferry, to avoid the shallows at Stainforth and Bramwith. The river was navigable to Rotherham in 1740, and to Tinsley by 1751.

Stainforth was connected to the River Trent by the opening on the Stainforth and Keadby Canal in 1802 and to the Aire and Calder Navigation by the New Junction Canal, opened in 1905. There were plans to use compartment boats to carry coal on the navigation, but although some locks were lengthened around 1910, Long Sandall lock was not, and it was not until 1959 that it was extended to 215 by 22 feet (65.5 by 6.7 m) and trains of 17 compartment boats could work through to Doncaster. The navigation was the subject of one of the last major attempts in the UK to attract commercial freight to the waterways. In 1983, it was upgraded to the 700-tonne Eurobarge standard by deepening the channels and enlarging the locks as far as Rotherham. The expected rise in freight traffic did not occur, however.

The cuts and navigable river sections, with the Stainforth and Keadby and the New Junction canals constitute the Sheffield and South Yorkshire Navigation. Locks on the Bramwith to Rotherham section can accommodate boats which are 230 by 20 feet (70.1 by 6.1 m), but above that, boats are restricted to 56 by 15 feet (17.1 by 4.6 m) by the short Rotherham lock.

=== Flooding ===
On the night of 26 October 1536, a sudden rise in the level of the River Don prevented the forces of the Pilgrimage of Grace from crossing the river at Doncaster, forcing them to enter into negotiations with Henry VIII's forces. The Great Sheffield Flood, which occurred on 11 March 1864 following the collapse of the Dale Dike Dam on a tributary of the River Loxley, destroyed 800 houses, destroyed or damaged most of the Don bridges upstream of Lady's Bridge (see "Bridges over River Don" section below) and killed 270 people.

The Don was also one of the rivers that flooded during the 2007 United Kingdom floods. Following high levels of rainfall, some 80 million cubic metres of rain fell on South Yorkshire on 25 June 2007. The river burst its banks in the late afternoon, flooding areas of Sheffield from Hillsborough to Meadowhall, and two people died after being swept away by the water. Parts of Rotherham and Doncaster were flooded for the second time in 10 days. Two days later, the army were called in to assist at Barnby Dun after the river flooded large areas near Thorpe Marsh Power Station.

The Don also burst its banks in November 2019, flooding villages along its course, notably Fishlake.

=== Catchment ===
The River Don catchment was the subject of extensive research investigations in the early 2000s, led primarily by the Catchment Science Centre, based at the University of Sheffield. A comprehensive summary of the river catchment was completed in 2008, describing the key social, economic and environmental characteristics of this historically important urban river and its main tributaries.

== Hydrology ==
The River Don, together with its main tributaries, the River Rother and the River Dearne, form a river system with a catchment of 714 square miles (1,850 km^{2}), which held a population of around 1.4 million in 1997. Much of the region is underlain by Carboniferous age Coal Measures rocks, and pollution of the river system has arisen where the coal has been mined. The headwaters rise on the moorlands of the Pennines, where the rocks are largely Millstone Grit, while the lower reaches pass through areas of alluvial and glacial material, up to 66 feet (20 m) thick, which overlies Magnesian Limestone strata and rocks assigned to the Sherwood Sandstone Group.

The impacts of human habitation, particularly the inadequate treatment of sewage effluent, and the growth of mining in the upper reaches and the processing of metals in the Sheffield area have resulted in serious pollution of the river, and the depletion of fish stocks, to the extent that large parts of the Don contained no fish until the mid-1980s. Concerted efforts have been made to improve the water quality, by reducing the concentration of metals, the ammonia content, and the biological oxygen demand (BOD), which is a measure of the amount of oxygen that is needed by organisms to break down organic matter in the water. Sewage treatment works on the Don, notably those at Cheesebottom, on the west bank of the river at Thurgoland and Blackburn Meadows at Tinsley, have been upgraded, as has that at Darton on the River Dearne. This has led to a great improvement in ammonia levels and BOD, further aided by the construction of biological treatment facilities for the processing of industrial effluent in the Doncaster area, while the decline in the steel industry in Sheffield has reduced the discharge of metals into the river.

Mining presents a different problem, as the mines have been abandoned, but the pollution continues. Near Penistone, ochre discharged into the river from old ganister mine workings, giving it an orange colour for about six miles, eventually remedied, while at Beeley Wood, the ochre comes from a pile of waste metal on the river bank. A nearby paper mill has also been a significant polluter of the river. Some of the problem has been mitigated by the construction of lagoons, into which mine discharges have been diverted. Water quality on the Dearne and the Rother has not improved as much as on the Don, and pollution of the lower reaches is compounded by the fact that the pollutants, which include dioxins, are locked up in the river bed sediments. Despite the steady improvement in water quality, restocking of the river with fish, attempted on several occasions between 1981 and 1994, was largely ineffective, caused by intermittent discharges of pollutants. In November 2011, the Environment Agency announced that they had recently re-stocked the Don with 1,000 barbel. A spokesman said that the fish in the river were now at a sustainable level with a breeding population and these would be the last fish added as part of a 10-year programme to help the Don recover from an industrial heritage that had depleted fish stocks.

== Water quality ==
The Environment Agency measure water quality of the river systems in England. Each is given an overall ecological status, which may be one of five levels: high, good, moderate, poor and bad. There are several components that are used to determine this, including biological status, which looks at the quantity and varieties of invertebrates, angiosperms and fish. Chemical status, which compares the concentrations of various chemicals against known safe concentrations, is rated good or fail.

The water quality of the Don was as follows in 2019.

| Section | Ecological Status | Chemical Status | Length | Catchment |
|---|---|---|---|---|
| Don from Source to Scout Dyke | Moderate | Fail | 11.9 miles (19.2 km) | 15.28 square miles (39.6 km^{2}) |
| Don from Scout Dyke to the Little Don | Moderate | Fail | 10.0 miles (16.1 km) | 9.55 square miles (24.7 km^{2}) |
| Don from Little Don to River Loxley | Moderate | Fail | 7.7 miles (12.4 km) | 12.07 square miles (31.3 km^{2}) |
| Don from River Loxley to River Don Works | Poor | Fail | 8.7 miles (14.0 km) | 9.29 square miles (24.1 km^{2}) |
| Don from River Don Works to River Rother | Poor | Fail | 3.5 miles (5.6 km) | 3.15 square miles (8.2 km^{2}) |
| Don from River Rother to River Dearne | Moderate | Fail | 13.7 miles (22.0 km) | 17.84 square miles (46.2 km^{2}) |
| Don from River Dearne to Mill Dyke | Moderate | Fail | 5.8 miles (9.3 km) | 8.52 square miles (22.1 km^{2}) |
| Sheffield and South Yorkshire Navigation | Good | Fail | 27.2 miles (43.8 km) | 8.52 square miles (22.1 km^{2}) |

Like most rivers in the UK, the chemical status changed from good to fail in 2019, due to the presence of polybrominated diphenyl ethers (PBDE), perfluorooctane sulphonate (PFOS) and mercury compounds, none of which had previously been included in the assessment.

== Settlements on the River Don ==
These are the settlements on the River Don from the source to the mouth. The largest city on the river is Sheffield. Settlements with a population of over 10,000 according to the 2001 census are shown in bold. The river's source, tributaries and mouth are in italics.

Winscar Reservoir

- Dunford Bridge
- Millhouse Green
- Thurlstone
- Penistone
- Oxspring
- Hunshelf
- Thurgoland

Confluence with Little Don River

- **Stocksbridge**
- Oughtibridge
- Sheffield
- **Rotherham**
- Kilnhurst
- **Swinton**
- Denaby
- Old Denaby
- **Mexborough**
- Denaby Main
- **Conisbrough**
- Cadeby
- Levitt Hagg (abandoned)
- Warmsworth
- New Edlington
- **Sprotbrough and Cusworth**
- **Doncaster**
- Long Sandall
- Barnby Dun with Kirk Sandall
- Thorpe in Balne
- Kirk Bramwith
- Braithwaite
- Bramwith
- Stainforth
- Fishlake
- **Thorne**
- Rawcliffe Bridge
- **Goole**

River Ouse

== Course ==
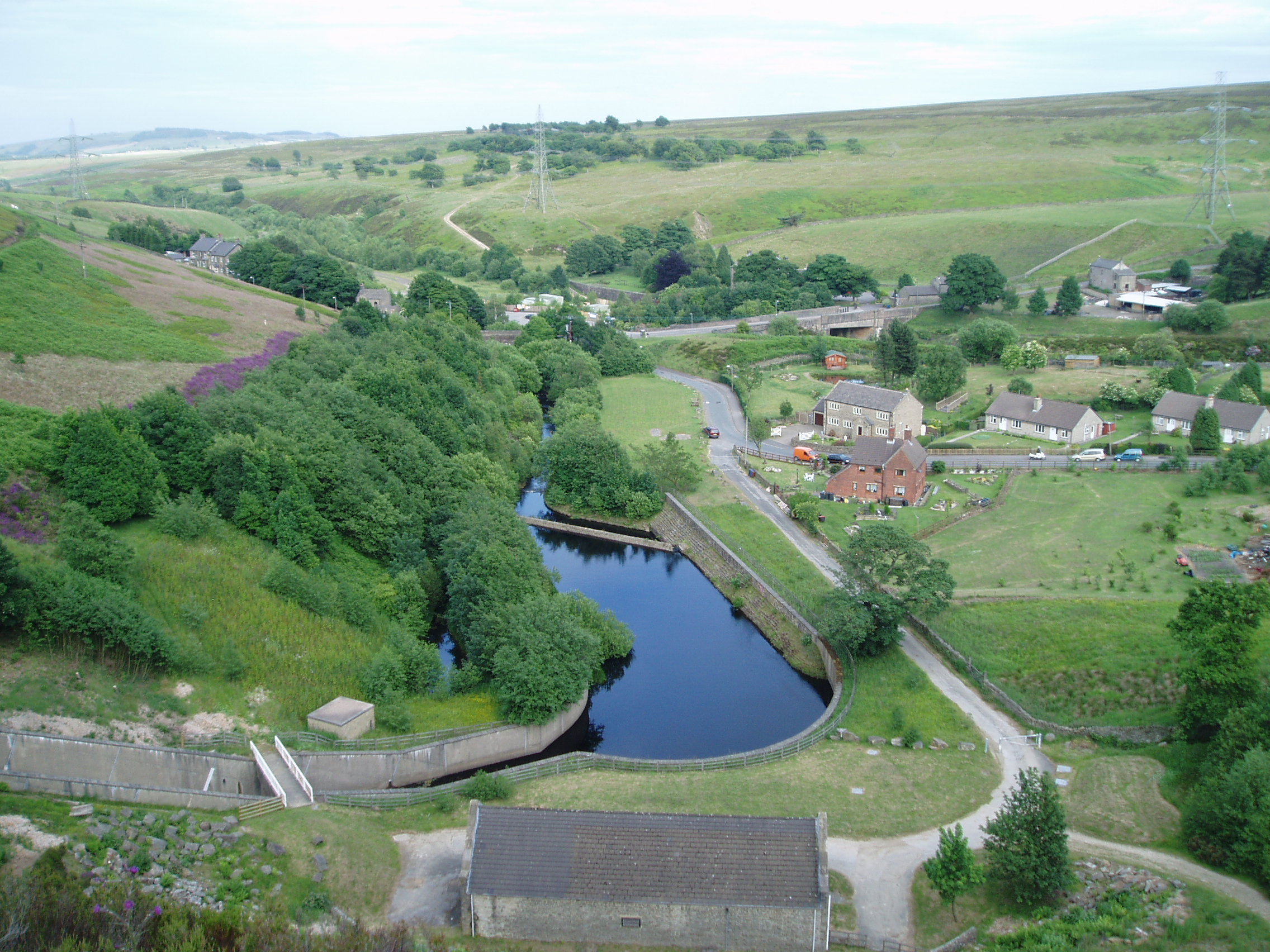
The hydraulic jump pool at the foot of Winscar Dam

The River Don rises in the Peak District, on Great Grains Moss, a millstone grit moorland area between 1,480 and 1,570 feet (450 and 480 m) above sea level. A series of small streams, including Great Grains and Black Grough join up, and within 1.2 miles (1.9 km) enter Winscar Reservoir. Reaps Dyke rises within 500 yards (460 m) of the source, and flows in a semicircle to the north, through Snailsden reservoir and Harden reservoir, to flow into another arm of Winscar reservoir. Just 100 yards (91 m) from the source, Withens Brook rises, but flows westwards, to supply the reservoirs of Longdendale and the people of Manchester. To the south of Winscar reservoir, other streams supply Upper Windleden and Lower Windleden reservoirs.

All of these reservoirs were built in the late 19th century for the Dewsbury and Heckmondwike Waterworks Board. Lower Windleden was the first to be completed in 1872, with Upper Windleden following in 1890. Winscar, Snailsden and Harden were all completed in 1899, although Winscar was called Dunford Bridge at the time. A new dam was built at Winscar between 1972 and 1975, and replaced the earlier earth dam. To fit it in, without destroying the village of Dunford Bridge, the dam is built of rock fill, which allows the faces to be much steeper than those of an earth dam, and the inner face is covered with two layers of asphaltic concrete, the first such use of this material on a dam in Britain. The dam is 174 feet (53 m) high and contains around 1,180,000 cubic yards (900,000 m^{3}) of rock fill. Another innovation in its construction was the use of a hydraulic jump pool at the foot of the overflow chute, which dissipates the energy of the cascading water. The reservoir supplies drinking water to the Calder Valley, some 12 miles (19 km) to the north, and is also the base for Pennine Sailing Club, who offer basic training in sailing skills, on courses certified by the Royal Yachting Association.

The Don flows from the foot of Winscar Dam, close to the eastern portal of the Woodhead Tunnel, through the Hamlet of Dunford Bridge, and continues, first east and then south-east, on its way to Sheffield. Near Penistone, the river is joined by Scout Dike, which flows from the Ingbirchworth, Royd Moor and Scout Dike reservoirs. The Little Don River or River Porter, on which there are three more reservoirs, joins the Don near Deepcar, while at Wharncliffe Side, the Ewden Beck joins, after flowing through Broomhead and More Hall reservoirs. By the time it reaches Oughtibridge, the river is below the 300-foot (91 m) contour.

=== Industrial sites ===
Below Oughtibridge, the course of the river is marked by a series of weirs, which were used to impound water, so that it could be used to power mills, hammers and grinding wheels. The gradient of the river bed is less than that of most of the Don's tributaries, which required the weirs to be spaced further apart, to prevent water from one mill backing up and preventing the next mill upstream from operating. The river falls by 160 feet (49 m) between Oughtibridge and Brightside, a distance of 8 miles (13 km), and by 1600, there were sufficient weirs that no new ones were built subsequently, although there were cases where additional mills were built, which used water from an existing weir. Most of the mill buildings have long since gone, but the weirs remain. All of the weirs on this section of the Don followed a similar pattern, with a weir built at an angle across the river, and a goit or channel leading from the lower edge to a reservoir or dam running parallel to the river. After the works, a tail goit returned water to the river. Water supply to the dam was controlled by shuttles which could be raised to allow water to enter the head goit.

The weir by Station Lane, Oughtibridge served the Upper Middlewood forge, described as a tilt in the sources, as it had a tilt hammer which was raised up and allowed to drop to shape the metal. The weir is in good order, although much of the original structure has been replaced by concrete steps. Next came Middlewood Works, which was a rolling mill and slitting mill, splitting bars of iron into thin strips for the manufacture of nails. Four water wheels were recorded in the 1820s, and water power was still being uses in 1900. The site was cleared after 1985, but the stone weir, with its nine bays, remains. Beeley Wood or Nova Scotia Tilts was a sizeable operation, with eight water wheels operating in the 1830s, four wheels driving two forges, another two driving the bellows for the forges, and the final two driving two tilt hammers. The works was recorded as derelict by 1895. In February 2016 the Environment Agency removed the middle two-thirds of Beeley Wood Lower Weir as part of a scheme to allow the free migration of fish and let the river return to a more natural form. The next works was Hawksley or Clay Wheels which employed 54 men in 1794, and was still using water power in 1895. The site was used to make scythes until after 1941, when a film, which can be seen at the Kelham Island Museum, was made of its activity. The weir has five bays, but is deteriorating.

Wadsley weir supplied a series of works which were situated to the east of the river channel. Wadsley Bridge paper mill was operational by 1709, and a tilt was also working by 1806. The wheel was 16.5 feet (5.0 m) in diameter and 6.83 feet (2.08 m) wide when it was surveyed in 1855, by which time the works had become Niagara Works. It was recorded as a forge which was still using water power in 1907. The weir remains, together with the shuttles which controlled the flow into the head goit, although the channel itself has been built over. Wadsley Bridge corn mill, which became a forge around 1800, originally took its water supply from the head goit of the paper mill, but was later connected to the tail goit. Wadsley Furnace was also located in this area. It was built for the Earl of Shrewsbury by 1583, but the blast furnace is thought to have been defunct by the 1670s. The final works in this section was Wadsley Forge or Wardsend Steel Works, which was operational from 1581 to the late 19th century, although the precise function varied. In 1819, there were two wheels supplying power to 69 troughs, where blades were ground. By 1849, it was described as a forge, and a high pressure steam engine was operational in 1855, to supplement the 15-foot (4.6 m) water wheel. The dams were out of use by 1892, and parts of the site are now occupied by Hillsborough Football Stadium.

Near the tail goit of the Wadsley works, the Don was joined by a small tributary, on which was located Rawsons Mill or Bark Mill. The mill building was separated from its dam by the building of the railway. The mill housed grinding wheels in 1862, but was used for milling corn in 1934. The dam remains full, overflowing through a culvert which passes beneath the railway. Owlerton Rolling Mill was next, located on the west bank, but was destroyed by fire around 1883. It had been reconstructed by 1907, when steam power assisted the water wheels, and was demolished in 1936. Only a small part of the weir remains. The next weir supplied Old Park corn mill, which was built around 1673. In 1807 a lease was issued to a group of 32 tenants, which included a miller, grinders, cutlers, a button maker, a scissorsmith and an ivory turner. In the early 20th century, it was known as Old Park Forge, and so had presumably changed its use. Old Park paper, silver or rolling mill followed. In 1795 it had a 12-foot (3.7 m) undershot wheel for rolling copper plates, and another of 18 feet (5.5 m) for rolling silver. The River Loxley joins the Don opposite the mill site, and the building was badly damaged by the great flood of 1864. The tenant claimed £1,932 in compensation, and received £1,720. A steam engine replaced the large water wheel in 1875, and the rest of the works was electrified in 1920. Sheffield Steel Rolling Co. continued to work the site until 1980.

Sandbed wheel was built in 1723, and by 1794, there were three water wheels supplying 52 grinding troughs. A steam engine was supplementing the wheels by 1886, but the wheels remained in use until at least 1907. The weir and the shuttles controlling the flow in the head goit remain. Below this, Morton wheels are known to have existed in 1581. The works became the Philadelphia Works around 1807, and a claim for £6,204 was made and received for damage caused by the 1864 flood. Next came Kelham Wheel, which was used as a cutlers wheel, a silk mill, and a cotton mill. Following fires in 1792 and 1810, the mill was rebuilt to use steam power, and became the Britannia Corn Mills after 1864. The buildings were demolished in 1975, but the weir remains in good order, and is one of the largest in Sheffield. Below this were the Town Corn Mill and wheel, which was water powered until 1877, and was the subject of an archaeological investigation in 1999, which uncovered the remains of the wheel pits.

Wicker Tilts and wheel was really two works, a grinding wheel known to have been working in 1581, and a tilt forge built in the 1740s. A second tilt was added near Lady's Bridge by 1752. The grinding wheel, which supplied 36 troughs, was replaced by a wire mill in the 1870s, and was still using water power in 1895, by which time the tilts were using steam power. The weir was close to Lady's Bridge, and the head goit flowed through one of the arches of the bridge. It is thought that there are several goits in culverts near Blonk Street, but their exact extent is unknown. The culverted Porter Brook joins the River Sheaf, which is also culverted, below Sheffield Railway Station, and the combined flows join the Don between Lady's Bridge and Blonk Street bridge.

=== Five Weirs Walk ===
The section of the river from Lady's Bridge to Meadowhall and the junction of the river with the Sheffield Canal has been designated as the Five Weirs Walk, by the creation of a footpath which closely follows its course. It contains the final five weirs before the navigable section is reached.

Walk Mill weir supplied the Upper and Nether Walk mills and wheels. The Nether Walk mill is thought to have been the site of a fulling mill mentioned in 1332, and was still operating as a fulling mill in 1760, when there were also two cutlers wheels at the lower site and one at the upper. The use of water wheels ceased in 1853, and both sites were recorded as the Albion Iron and Steel Works in 1864. Burton Weir supplied Royds mill and wheels, which also operated on two sites, and included a corn mill and cutlers wheels. Steam power was used from 1860, although a redundant water wheel remained in situ until 1950.

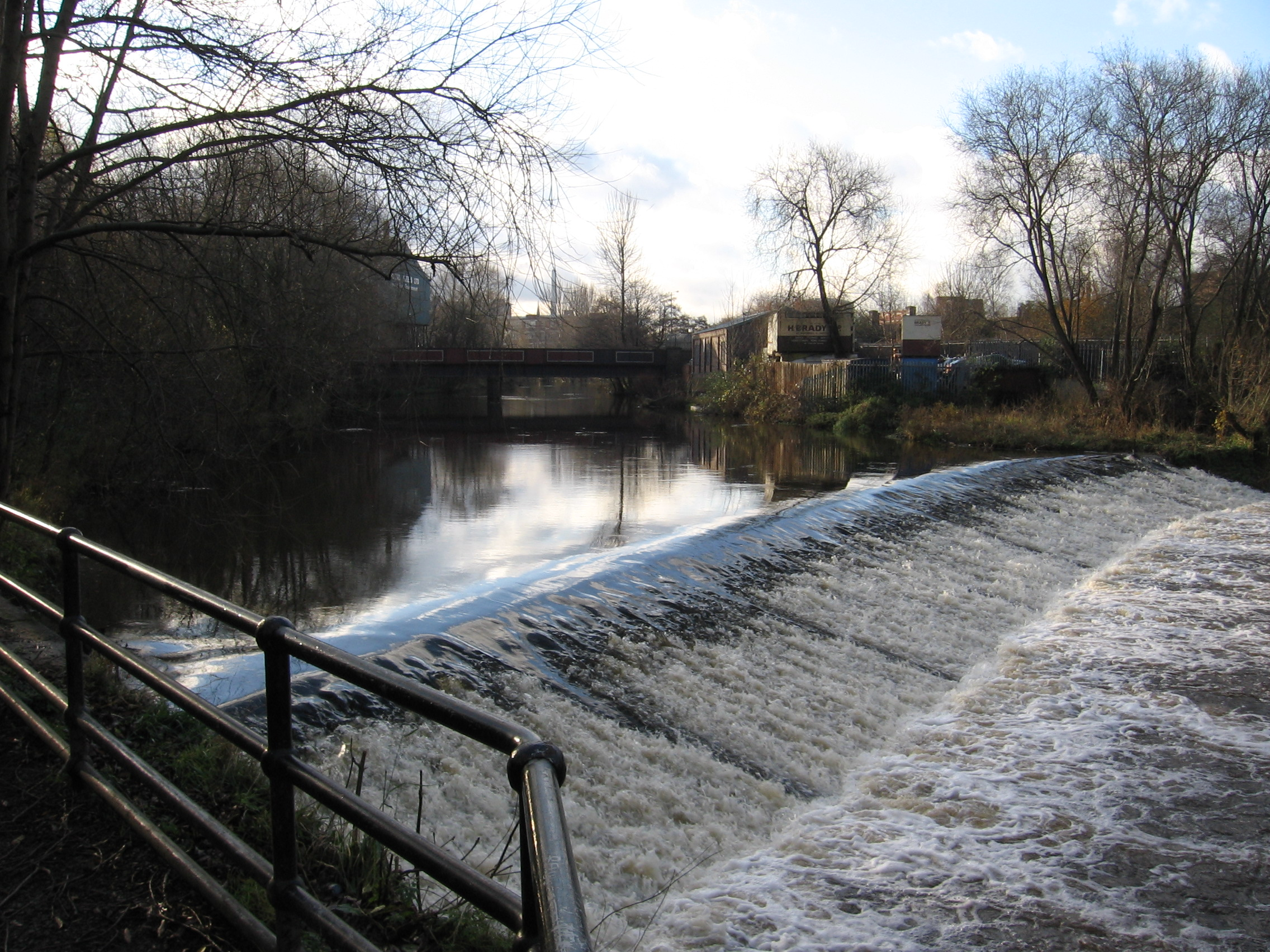
Sandersons Weir

Sanderson's weir provided water for the Upper Hammer, on the south side of the river, which was converted into the Attercliffe slitting mill in 1746. By 1802 it was described as being in a decayed state, and the dam and goit were filled in by 1818. The weir also supplied the Nether Hammer on the north side of the river, which was first recorded in the 1580s. The forge was sold in 1869, one part to the Midland Railway, and the other to Sandersons, who had six water wheels in 1895, but the works was running on steam power by 1907. In addition to the weir, the head goit is still visible, passing under the railway twice, to disappear into a culverted drain.

Brightside weir supplied a corn mill from before 1383 until 1690. Two cutlers wheels were added in 1706, and the works had become a forge by 1789. Four wheels were recorded in 1895, and a set of tilt hammers from the site were rescued and moved to Abbeydale Industrial Hamlet. Hadfields Weir is the final weir on this stretch, which supplied Parker Wheel initially, and then a paper mill from the 1750s. At various times there were two flour mills, two forges and then a rolling mill. The precise location of the works is difficult to trace, as the river has been straightened below the weir, but the weir itself can be seen from Meadowhall Shopping Centre.

== Bridges ==
This section provides details of some of the many bridges crossing the River Don, in west-to-east (river source to river mouth) order.

=== Bridges in Upper Don area ===
This area stretches from the source of the River Don down to and including Oughtibridge. There are many minor crossings of the Don in this area, so only a selection of bridges is covered in this section.

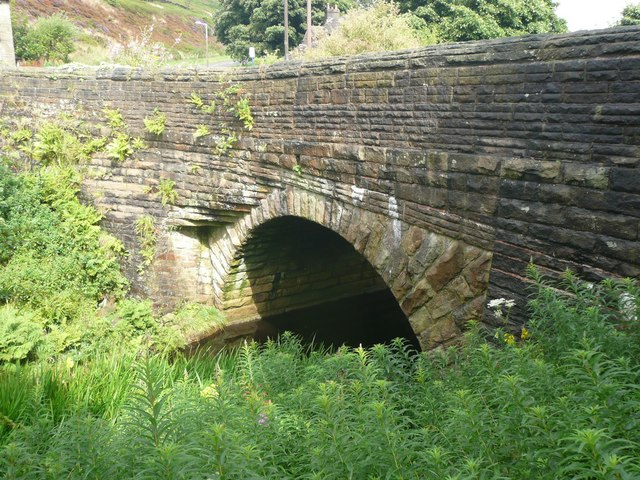
Dunford Bridge

==== Dunford Bridge ====
The road bridge at the small hamlet of Dunford Bridge carries the unclassified Windle Edge Road across the River Don. The source of the Don is about 2.5 miles (4 km) to the west and the retaining dam of Winscar Reservoir is 1,300 feet (400 m) to the west. The road bridge is 160 feet (50 m) below the surface level of the water in the reservoir.

Thurlstone Leapings Lane footbridge

==== Thurlstone Leapings Lane footbridge ====
One of many footpath crossings of the Don in the upper part of its course. This path links the A628 (near St Saviour's Church) with Leapings Lane. There is a ford by the side of the footbridge and this can be easily crossed by road vehicles for most of the year.

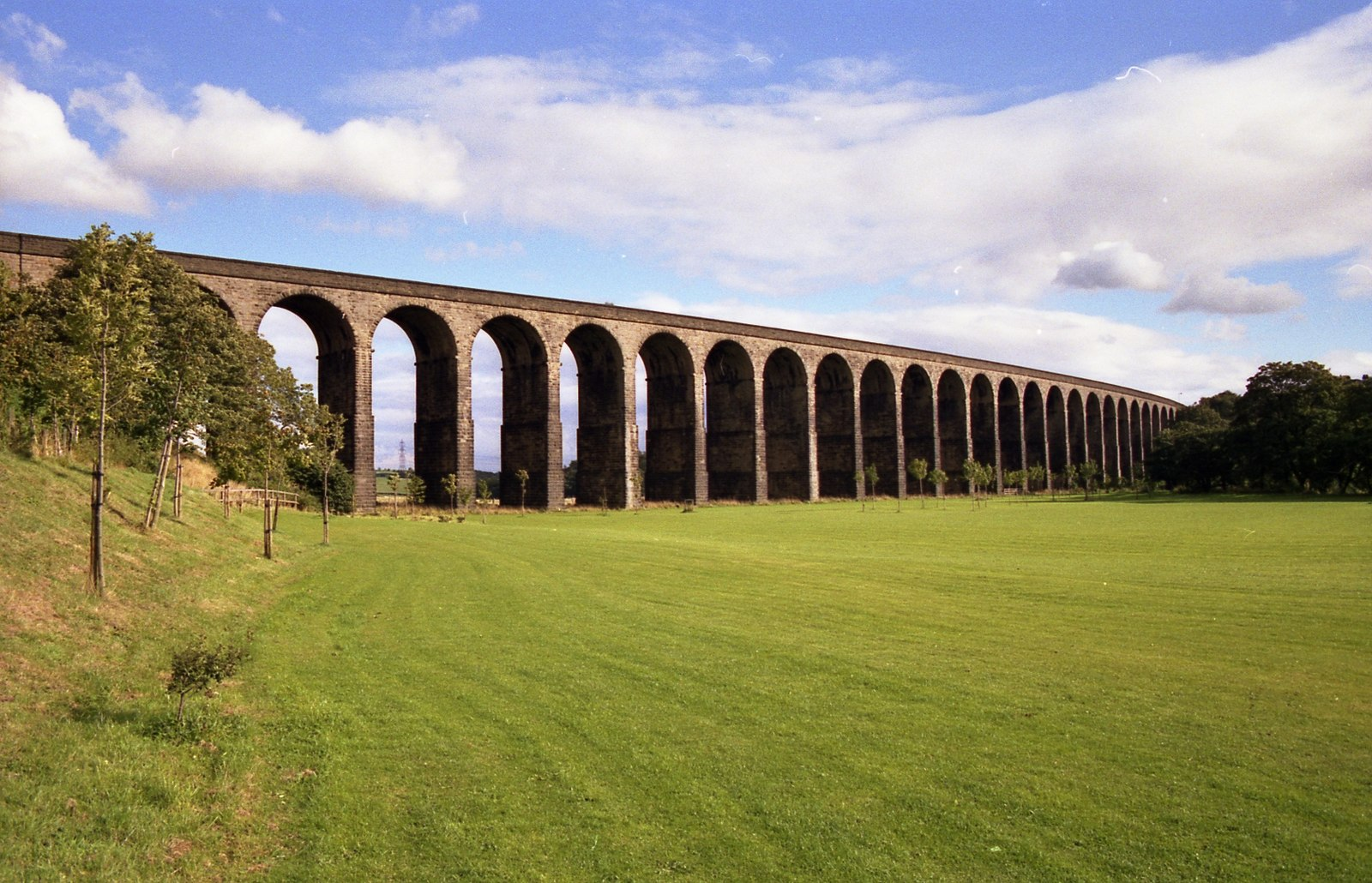
Penistone Viaduct

==== Penistone Viaduct ====
This is a curving 29-arch viaduct which is 980 feet (300 m) long and 98 feet (30 m) high where it crosses the River Don. It is used by passenger services on the route from Sheffield to Huddersfield ("The Penistone Line"). It was built in 1850 by Sir John Fowler for the Huddersfield & Sheffield Junction Railway (later the Great Central Railway). The viaduct suffered a partial collapse in 1916. The viaduct crosses the B6462 Thurgoland to Penistone road as well as the River Don.

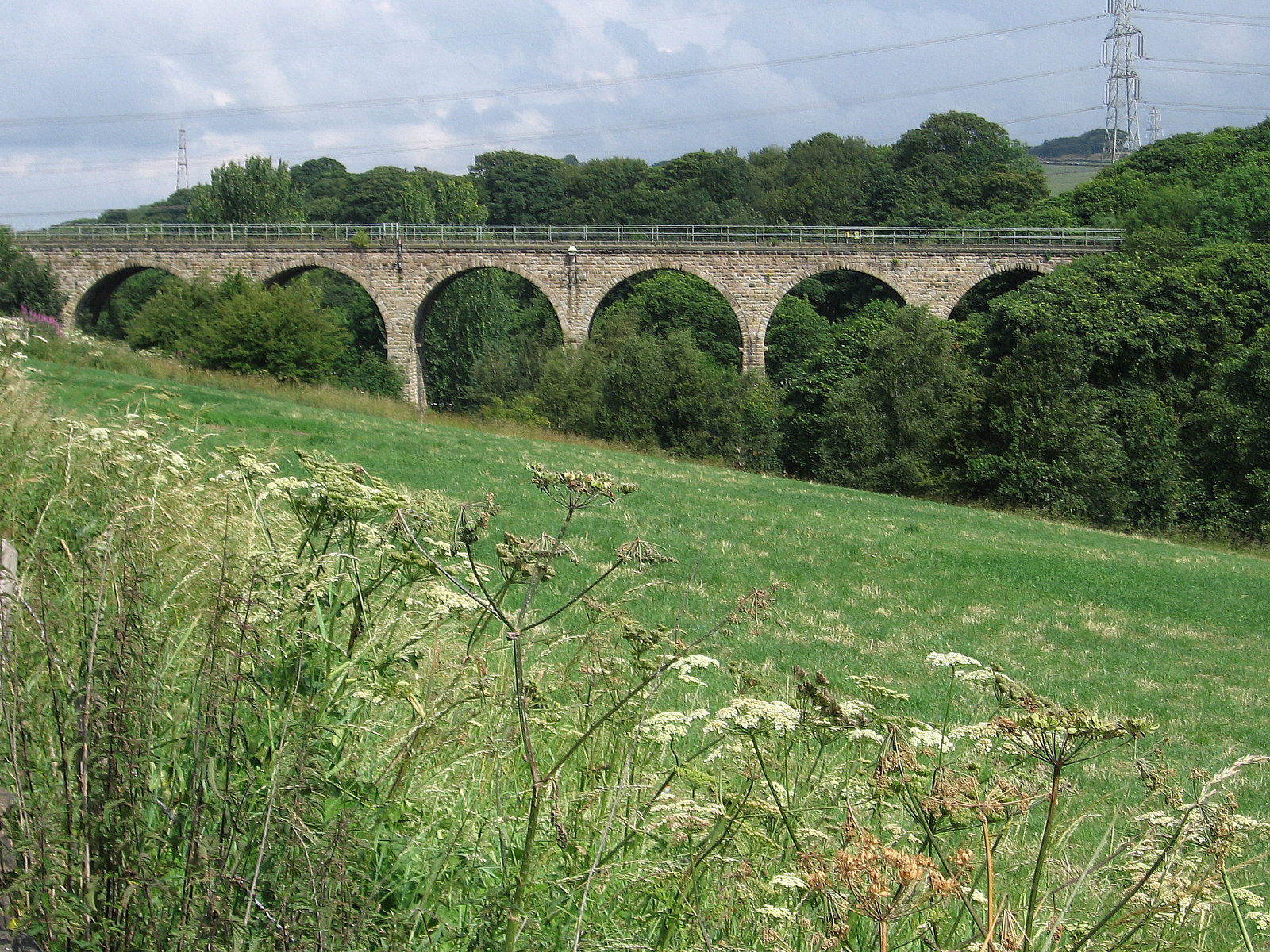
Oxspring Viaduct

==== Oxspring Viaduct ====
This is a seven-arch viaduct, built around 1855, which crosses the B6462 Thurgoland to Penistone road as well as the River Don. The railway that it conveys started off as a local colliery line of the South Yorkshire Railway Company and later became part of a trunk freight route which reached its traffic peak in the early 1950s. From 1983 the line has been used for local passenger services between Sheffield and Huddersfield via Barnsley.

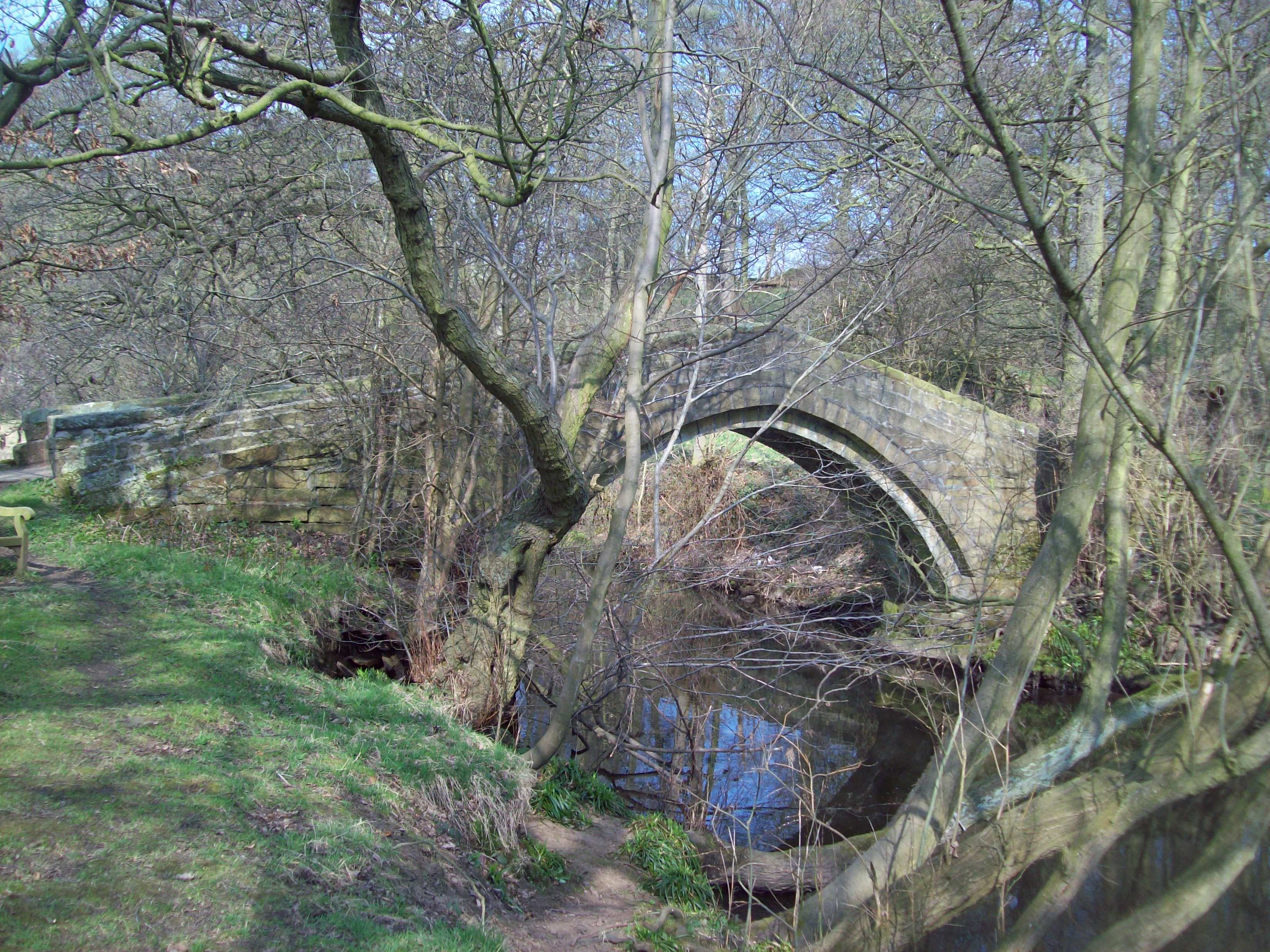
Oxspring Willow Footbridge

==== Oxspring Willow Footbridge ====
Built about 1734, this narrow stone bridge conveyed the packhorse trail from Leeds to Cheshire. It now forms part of the Trans Pennine Trail. It is listed Grade II by English Heritage.

==== Romtickle Viaduct ====
This substantial viaduct conveys the long-distance Trans Pennine Trail across the River Don and its valley which is narrow at this point. The name of the viaduct varies. Barnsley Council sign-boards call this Romticle Viaduct, local newspapers call it Rumtickle Viaduct and 1940s LNER plans call it Romptickle Viaduct. Built in 1844 from local stone, it formed part of the Sheffield to Manchester Railway which opened in 1845. Trains ceased on this section of the line in May 1983.

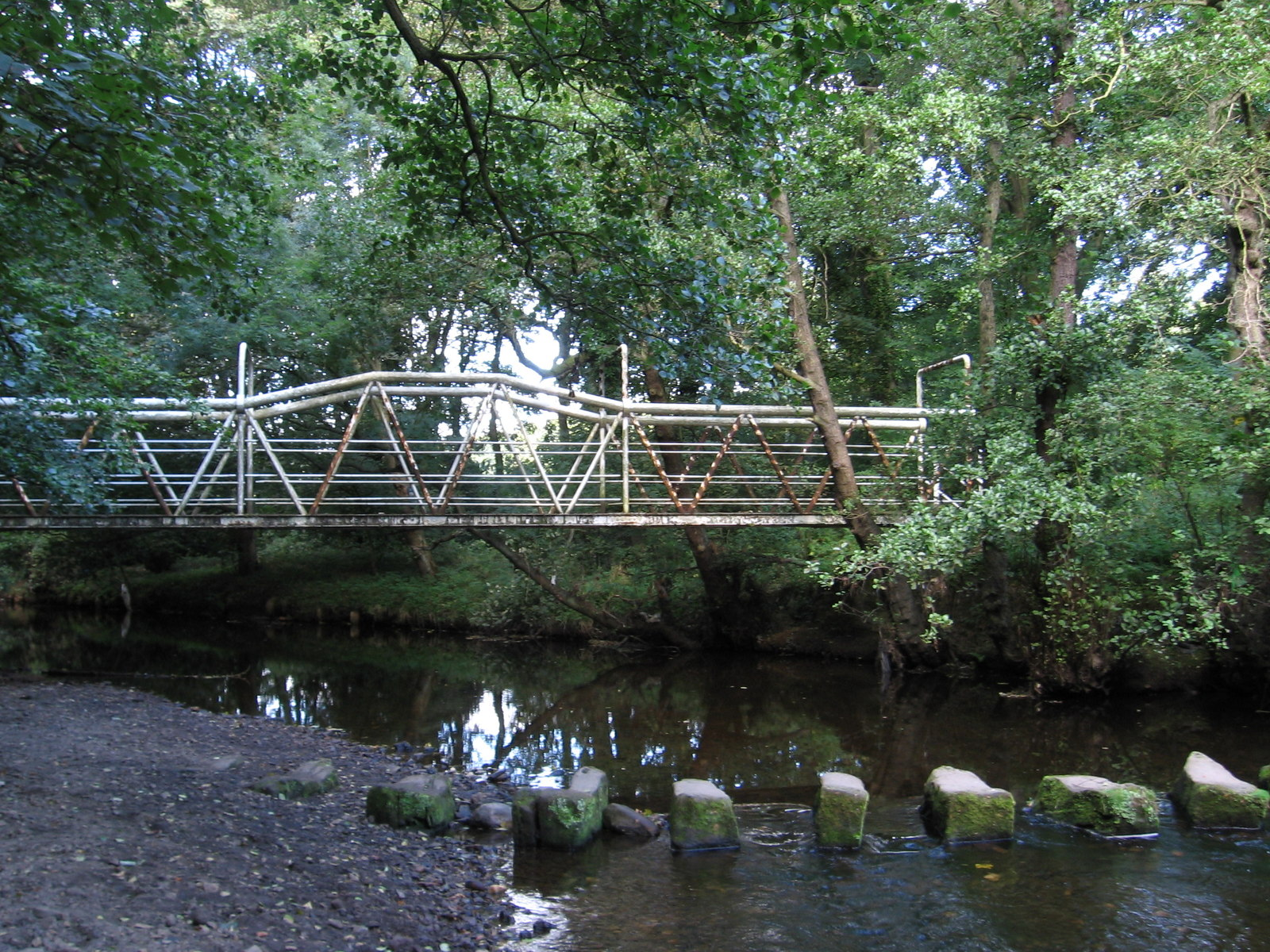
Wortley Footbridge

==== Wortley Footbridge ====
This footbridge is on the Barnsley Boundary Walk, upstream of Tin Mill Dam. It provides a drier alternative to the adjacent set of stepping stones when the river level is high. The bridge has an above-deck truss design and is constructed largely of tubular steel. It was manufactured by Tubewrights Ltd of Newport (Monmouthshire). This was a company that specialised in the fabrication of tubular steel structures. It had other factories in London, Liverpool and Glasgow and was in business from 1899 until 1981. In 1961, the company employed 1,200 people. This pre-fabricated design of footbridge was popular in the years immediately after the Second World War and examples can be found all over Britain.

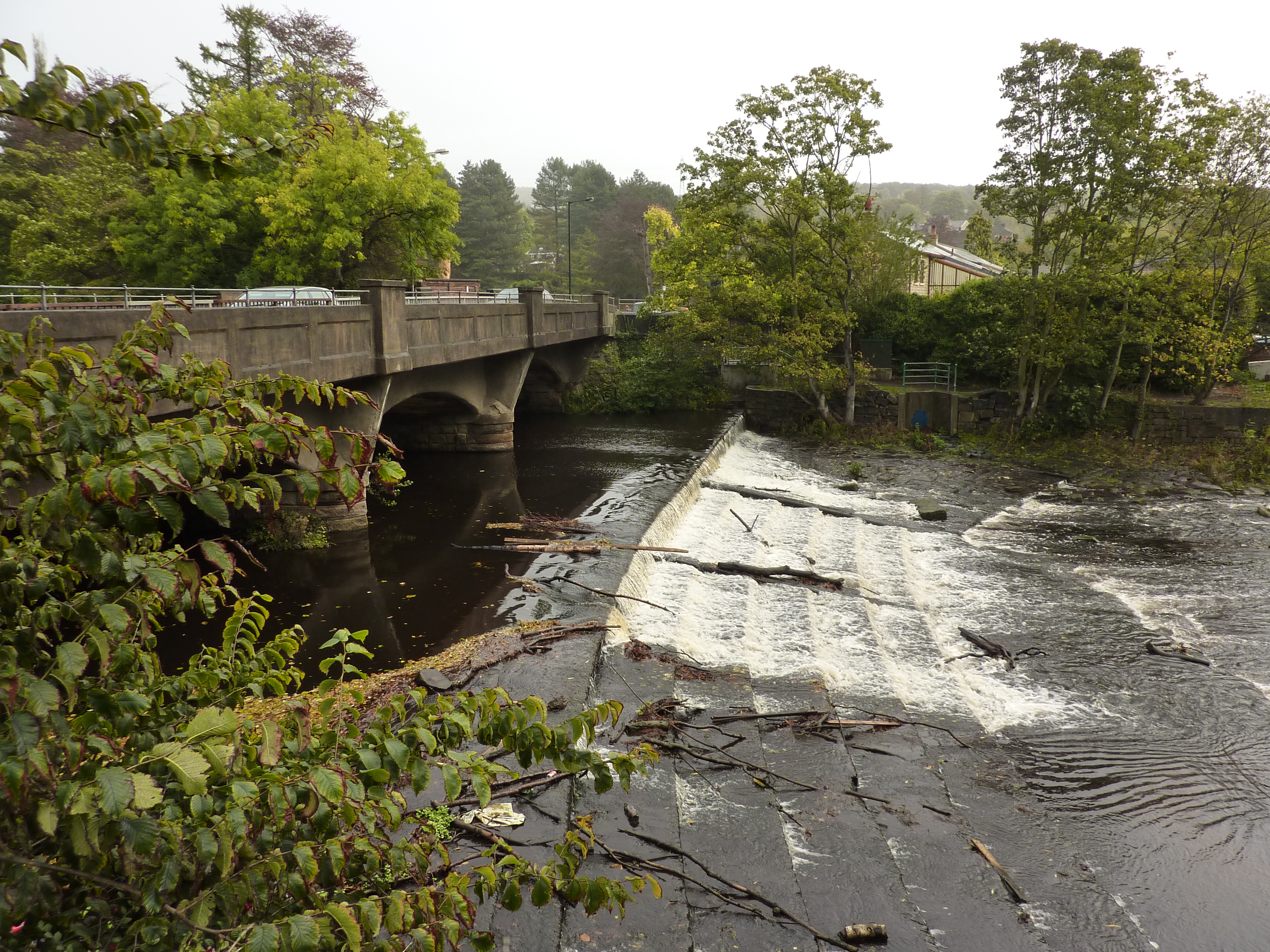
Oughtibridge – river at normal level

==== Oughtibridge Station Lane Bridge ====
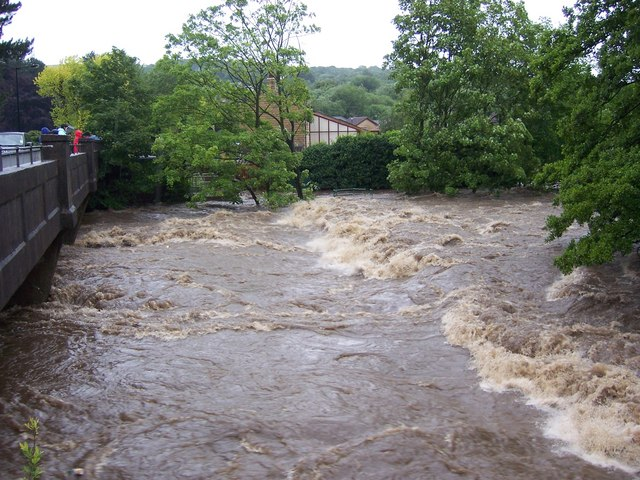
Oughtibridge – river in flood (2007)

Station Lane bridge carries the unclassified road from Oughtibridge to Grenoside over the River Don. The station referred to is the "Oughty Bridge Station" (east of the road bridge) on the former Great Central Railway Company's Sheffield to Manchester route. It opened in 1845 and closed to passengers in 1959.

Like most of the upper Don, the river at Oughtibridge appears fairly benign, with it having a small flow and being easily fordable below the weir to the south of the bridge. However, as discussed in the Flooding section above, its wide catchment area and the sometimes-extreme weather in the Pennines makes the river susceptible to occasional flooding. The two photographs illustrate the contrast.

=== Bridges in Hillsborough area ===
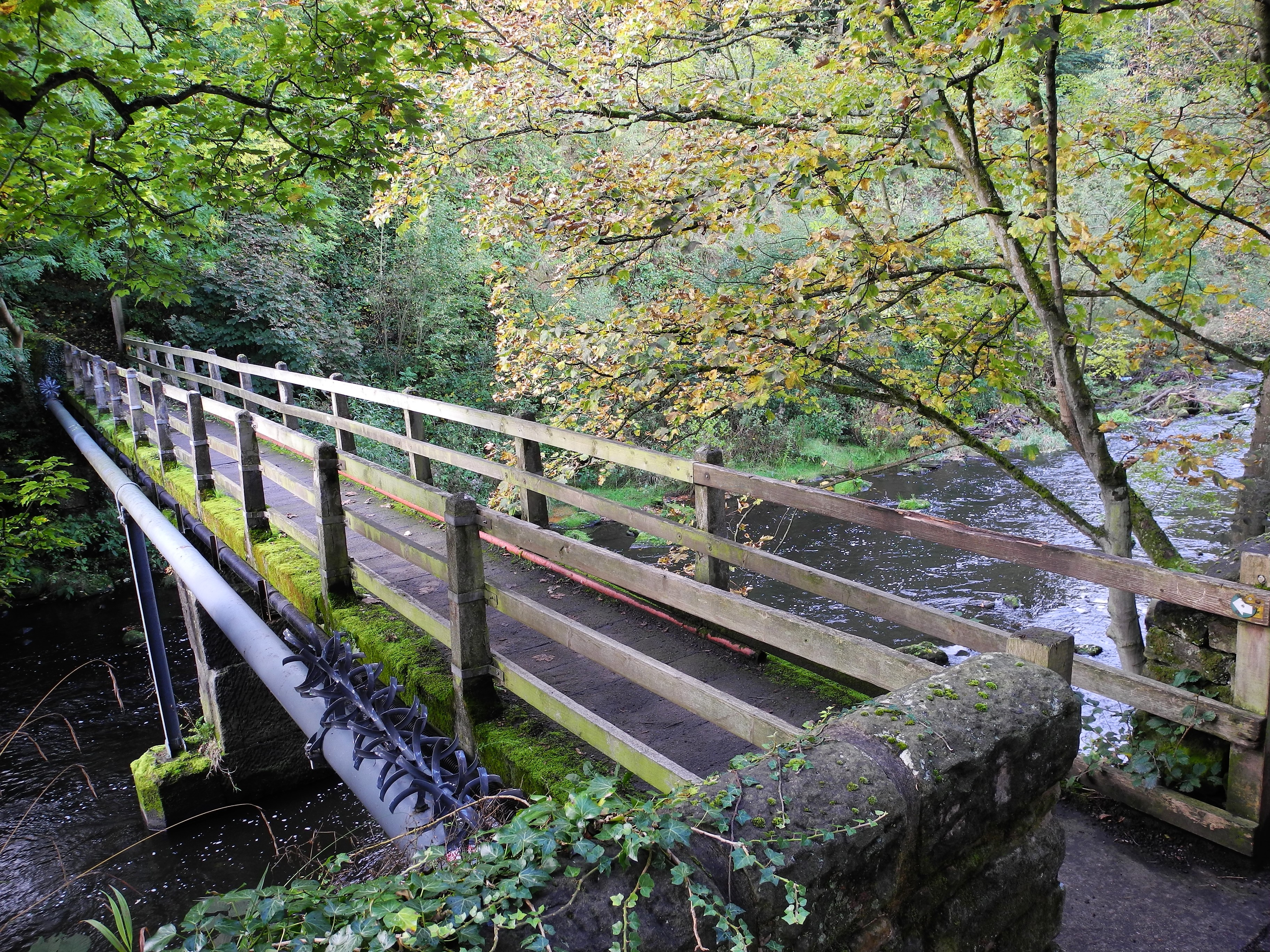
Rocher Bridge

==== Rocher Bridge ====
This footbridge over the River Don is the only crossing in the 4 km between Station Lane Bridge in Oughtibridge and Leppings Lane, Hillsborough. It was originally erected to allow workmen across the river to work in the ganister mines of Beeley Wood and the factories in the Clay Wheels Lane area of Sheffield. This is another benign-looking stretch of the upper Don. However, during the 2007 floods, the retaining wall of the A6102 Middlewood Road North was washed away just north of Rocher Bridge. It was over a year before the damage could be repaired and the road re-opened.

==== Leppings Lane bridge ====
This carries the A6102 over the River Don. Leppings Lane was originally Leapings Lane which got its name from some nearby stepping stones over the river.

==== Hillsborough Stadium footbridge ====
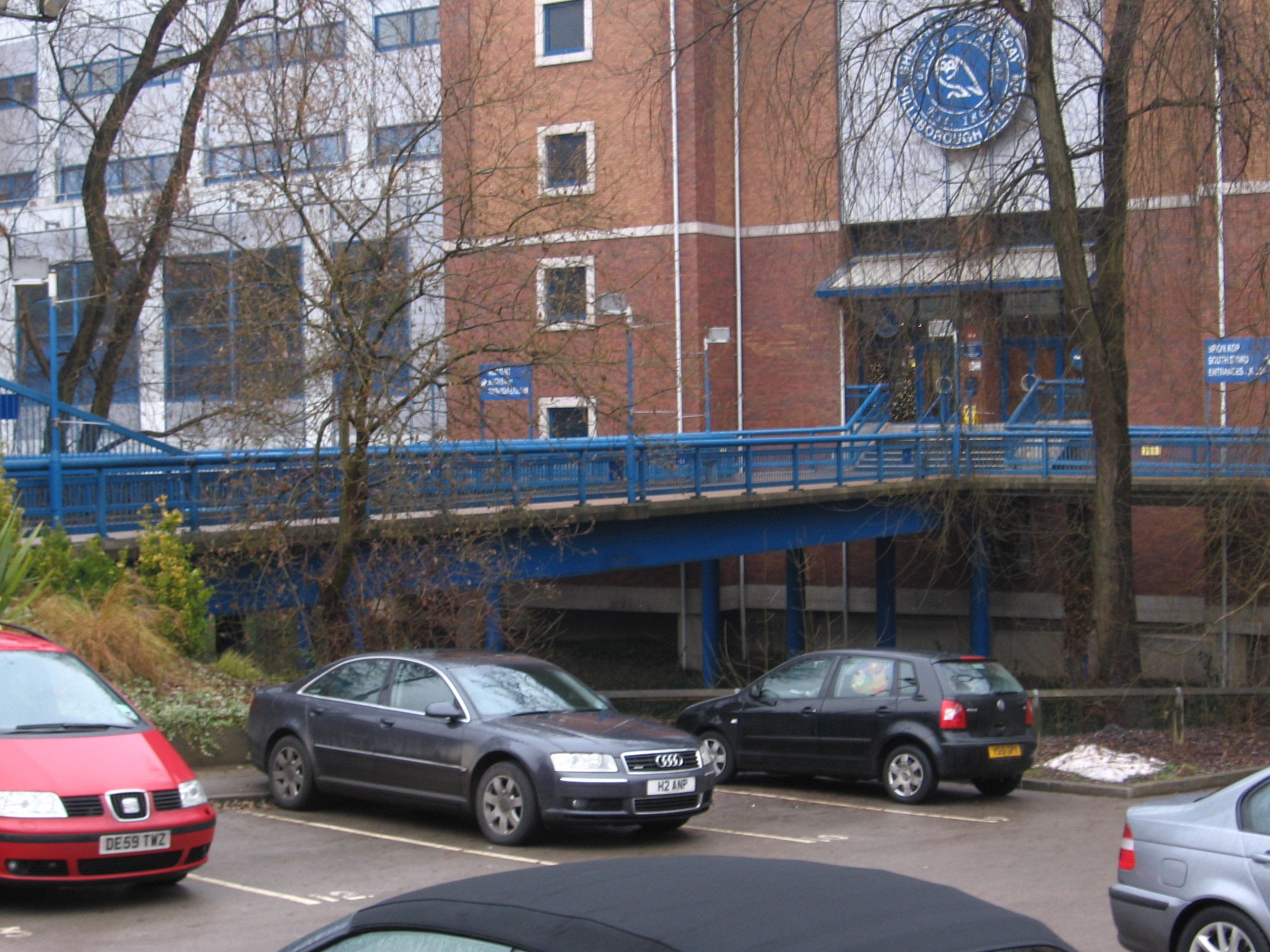
Hillsborough Stadium footbridge

This footbridge connects Parkside Road with the main entrance to the football stadium. The bridge was built as part of the major £7 million re-development for the Euro 1996 international competition. As regards the stadium itself, the first match played was on 2 September 1899 and in 1966 the stadium was selected as one of the venues for the Football World Cup. Very close to the footbridge is a memorial to the 97 fans that lost their lives at Hillsborough in 1989, during the FA Cup semi-final between Liverpool and Nottingham Forest. In June 2007, the River Don burst its banks during a period of severe weather in the area and the whole ground was flooded with several feet of water. As part of the abortive plans for England staging the 2018 World Cup, a new bridge had been planned across the River Don for entry to the West Stand and would have been slightly upstream of the main entrance footbridge.

==== Penistone Road North bridge ====
This carries the A61 dual carriageway across the River Don. This part of the A61, which fronts the football ground, was widened in time for the 1966 World Cup matches and still features the flagpoles for the event.

==== Cadbury's works bridges ====
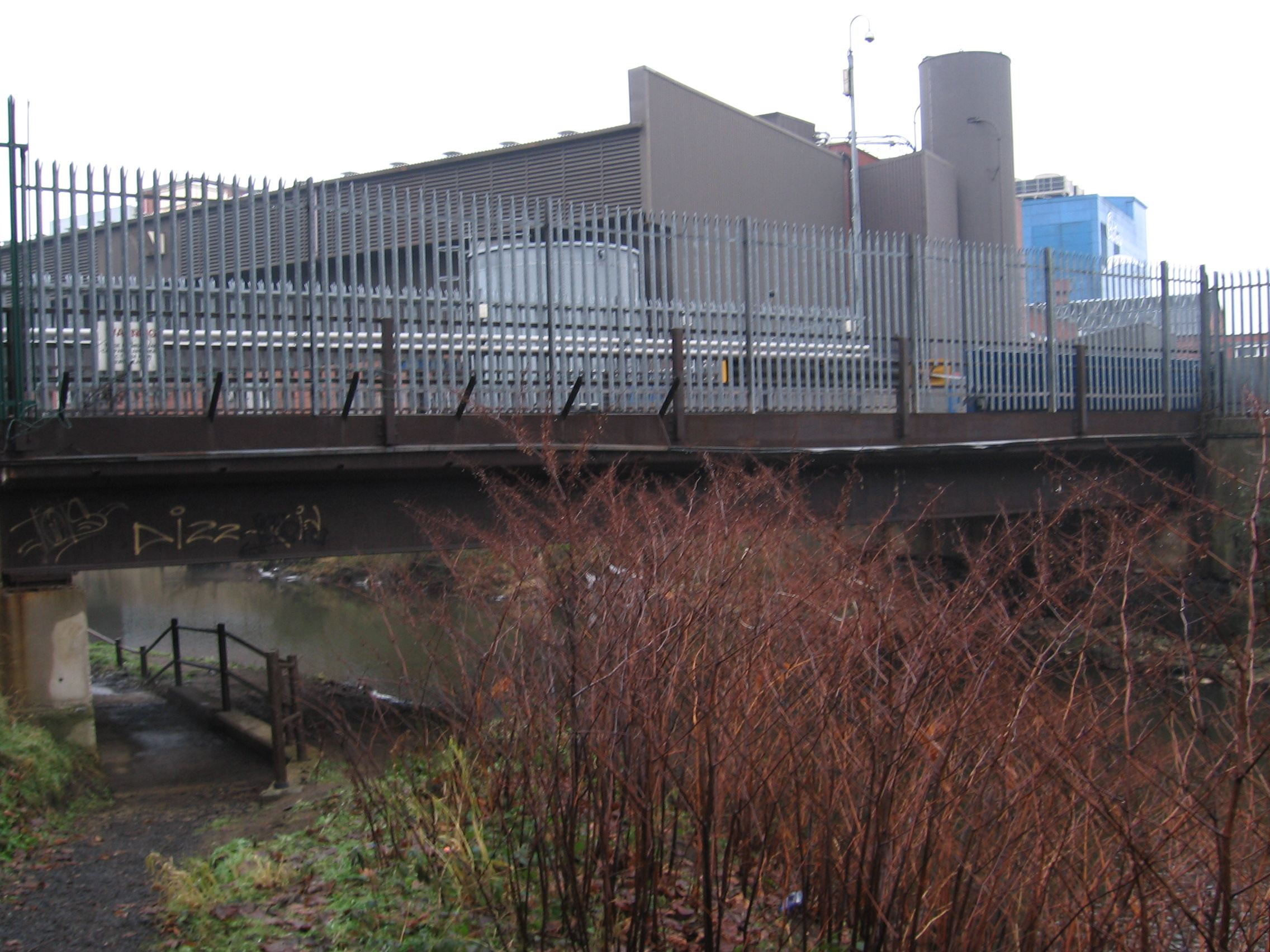
Cadbury's works bridge (west)

There are two private bridges that connect the Cadbury's works on either side of the Don. There is a public footpath along the northern bank of the Don which goes under the two bridges. The footpath will eventually form part of the Upper Don Walk. The Cadbury's, previously Bassett's, works is one of the major employers in the area. The George Bassett & Co. Ltd sweet factory is one of the longest serving of local firms, known for its manufacture of Liquorice Allsorts. The firm was established in Sheffield in 1842 but did not come to Owlerton until 1934 when Bassett's son-in-law, Samuel Meggit Johnson, built a large factory on Beulah Road on the south side of the Don. The factory was enlarged in the inter-war period as new products, such as Jelly Babies, Wine Gums and Liquorice Novelties, were added to the range.

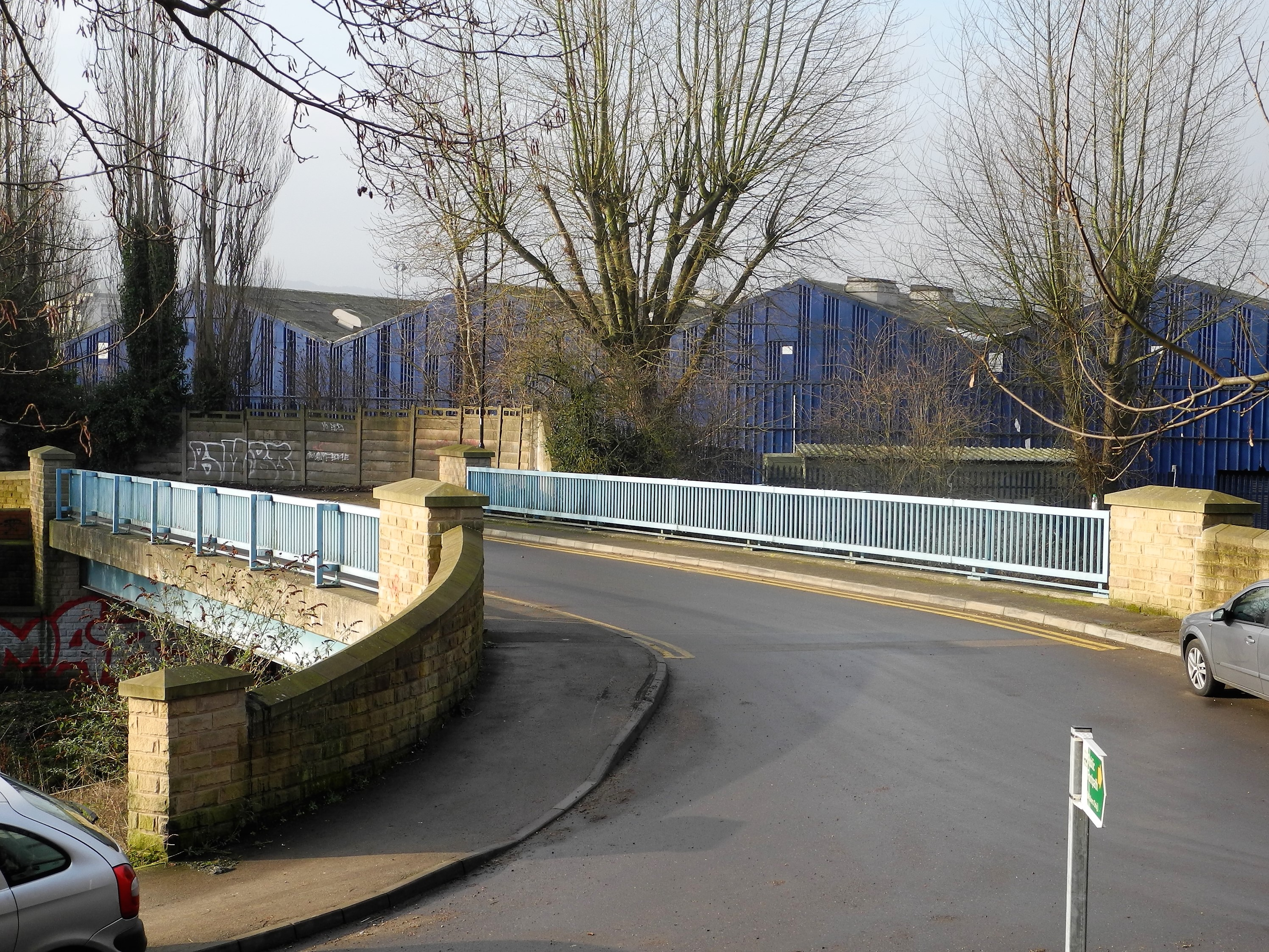
The new Wardsend bridge

In 1989 Bassetts was purchased by the Cadbury Schweppes group and became part of its confectionery subsidiary Cadbury Trebor Bassett. In 2010, Cadbury's was taken over by Kraft.

==== Wardsend Bridge ====
This bridge in Hillsborough carries Livesey Street over the Don to Club Mill Road. The previous bridge was a two-arched stone bridge, built in the 18th century to provide access to Wardsend Cemetery, and was destroyed by the floods on 25 June 2007. It was rebuilt as a 31.2-foot-wide (9.5 m) single-span integral bridge at an estimated cost of £673,000 and re-opened in early 2009.

=== Bridges in Sheffield area ===
==== Hillfoot Bridge ====
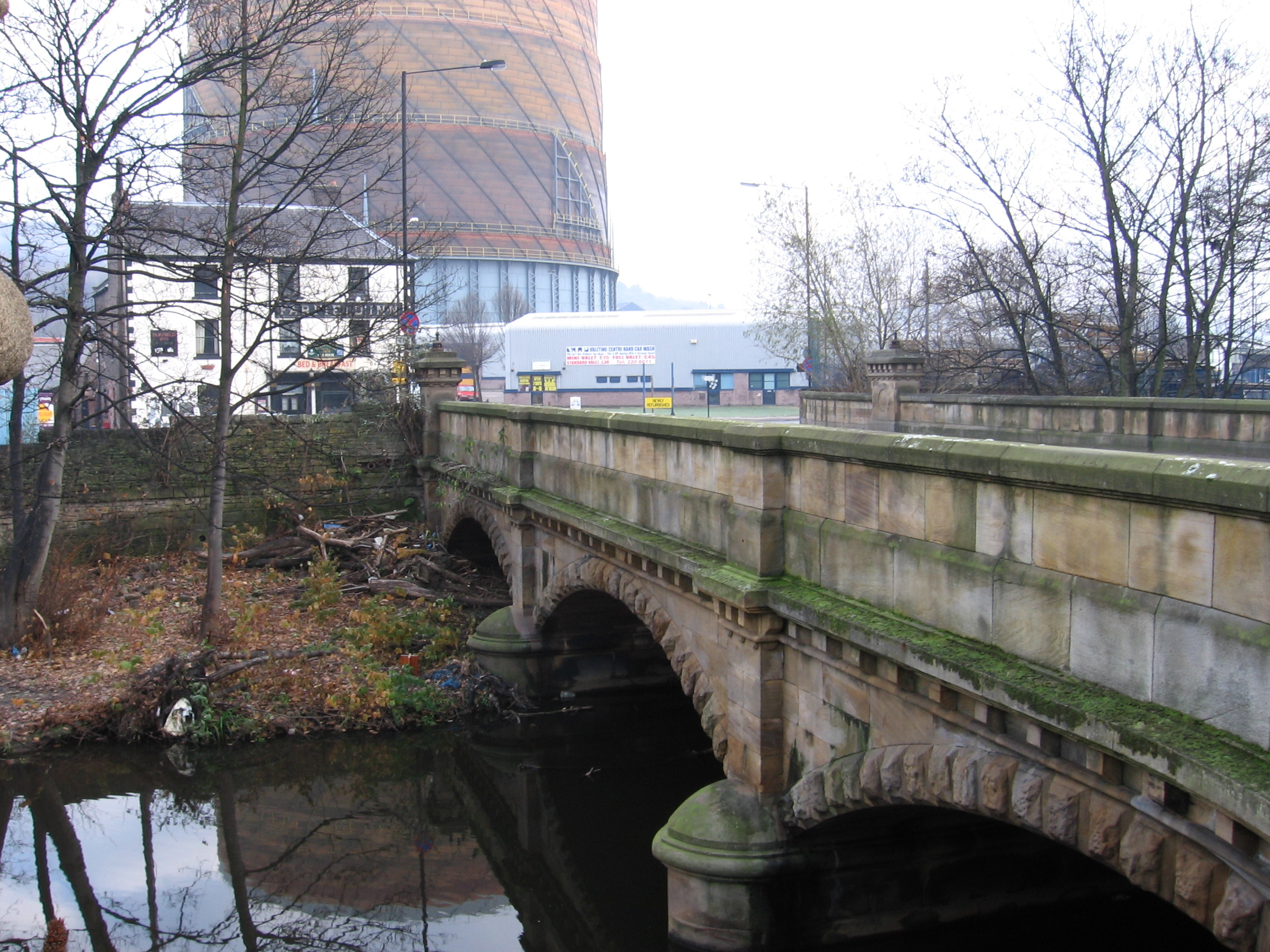
Hillfoot Bridge

This bridge carries Neepsend Lane (B6074) over the River Don. On 11 March 1864, the previous wooden bridge was swept away by the Great Sheffield Flood, caused by the collapse of Dale Dike Dam. The bridge was replaced by a three-arched stone structure in 1885. Alterations made in 1912 included rounded approaches, and lighting was provided by cast-iron gas lamps, contributed by the Neepsend Gasworks, which was located nearby.

==== Rutland Road Bridge ====
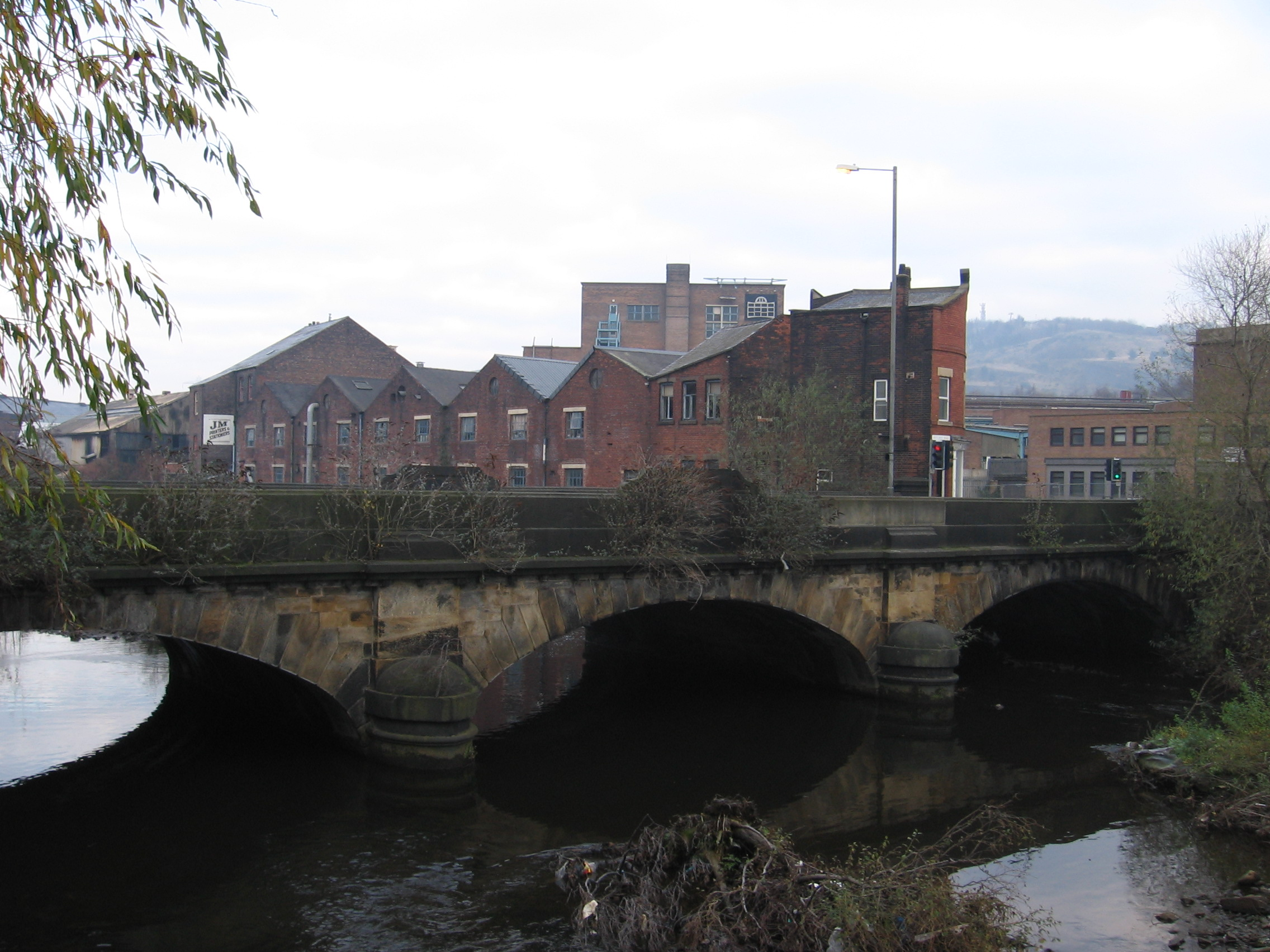
Rutland Road Bridge

This bridge carries Rutland Road (B6070) over the River Don. In the 1800s, this bridge was commonly known as Neepsend Bridge. In the Great Sheffield Flood of 1864, the Neepsend bridge managed to withstand the onslaught although a large amount of debris was piled up against it. The three elliptical arches were built in 1854, although the parapet is slightly later, as it had to be rebuilt following damage sustained during the flood.

==== Ball Street Bridge ====
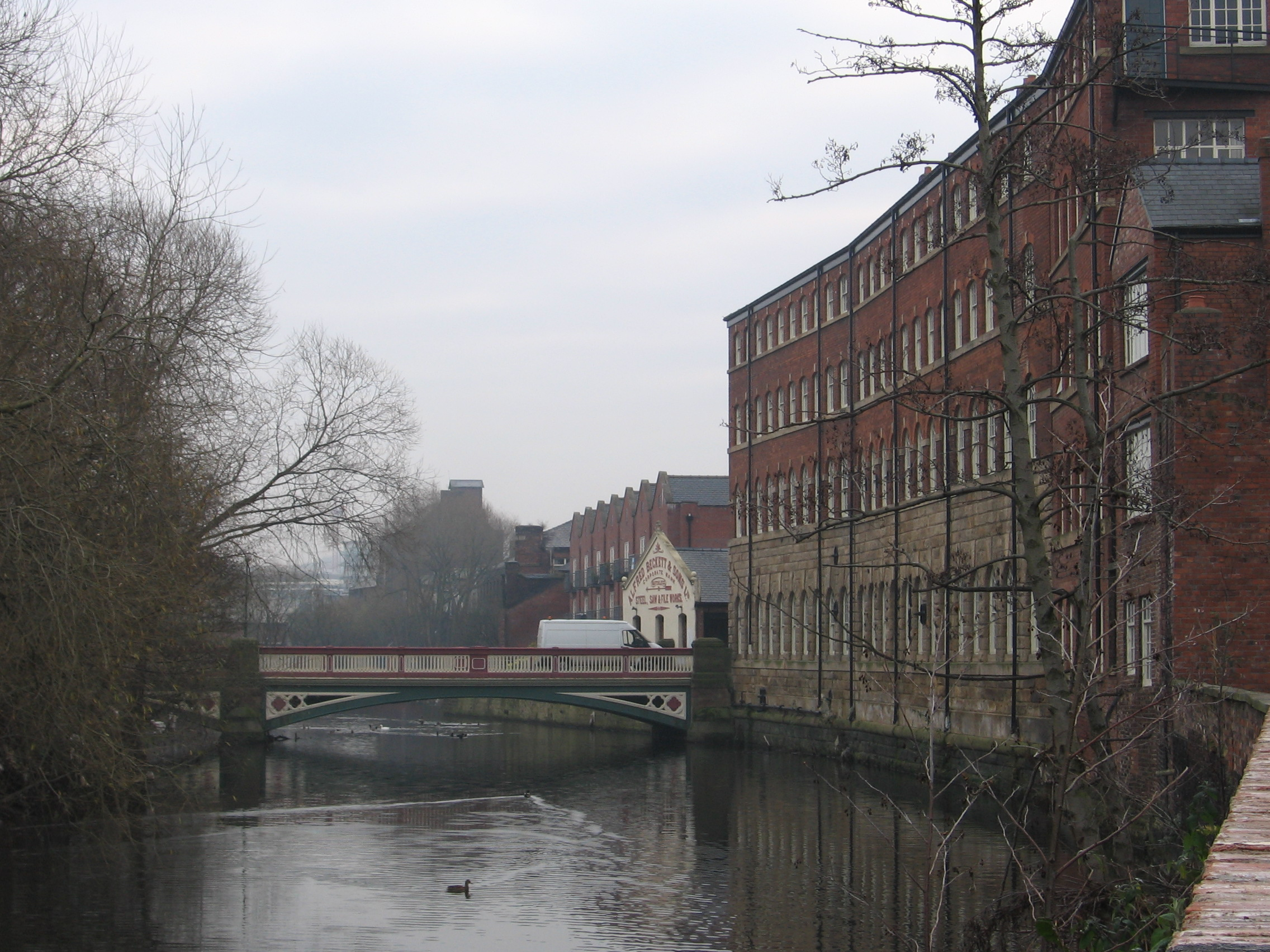
Ball Street Bridge

This road bridge carries Ball Street over the River Don. The original footbridge at this point was destroyed in the Great Sheffield Flood of 1864. Samuel Harrison writes: "The Ball Street foot bridge, adjoining Mr. Mills's tannery, was destroyed. Although it was constructed of iron, it was torn down by the force of the water, and bent about as though it were only a piece of pasteboard. A large portion of it might be seen long afterwards lying in the river in a sloping position, and not entirely disconnected from its original position at one end." It was rebuilt in 1865, with three cast-iron spans which were manufactured at the Milton Iron Works in Elsecar. It features pierced Gothic parapets. The spans are carried on stone piers, and the bridge was widened in 1900. Kelham Weir (also known as Ball Street Weir) is just downstream of the bridge.

==== Borough Bridge ====
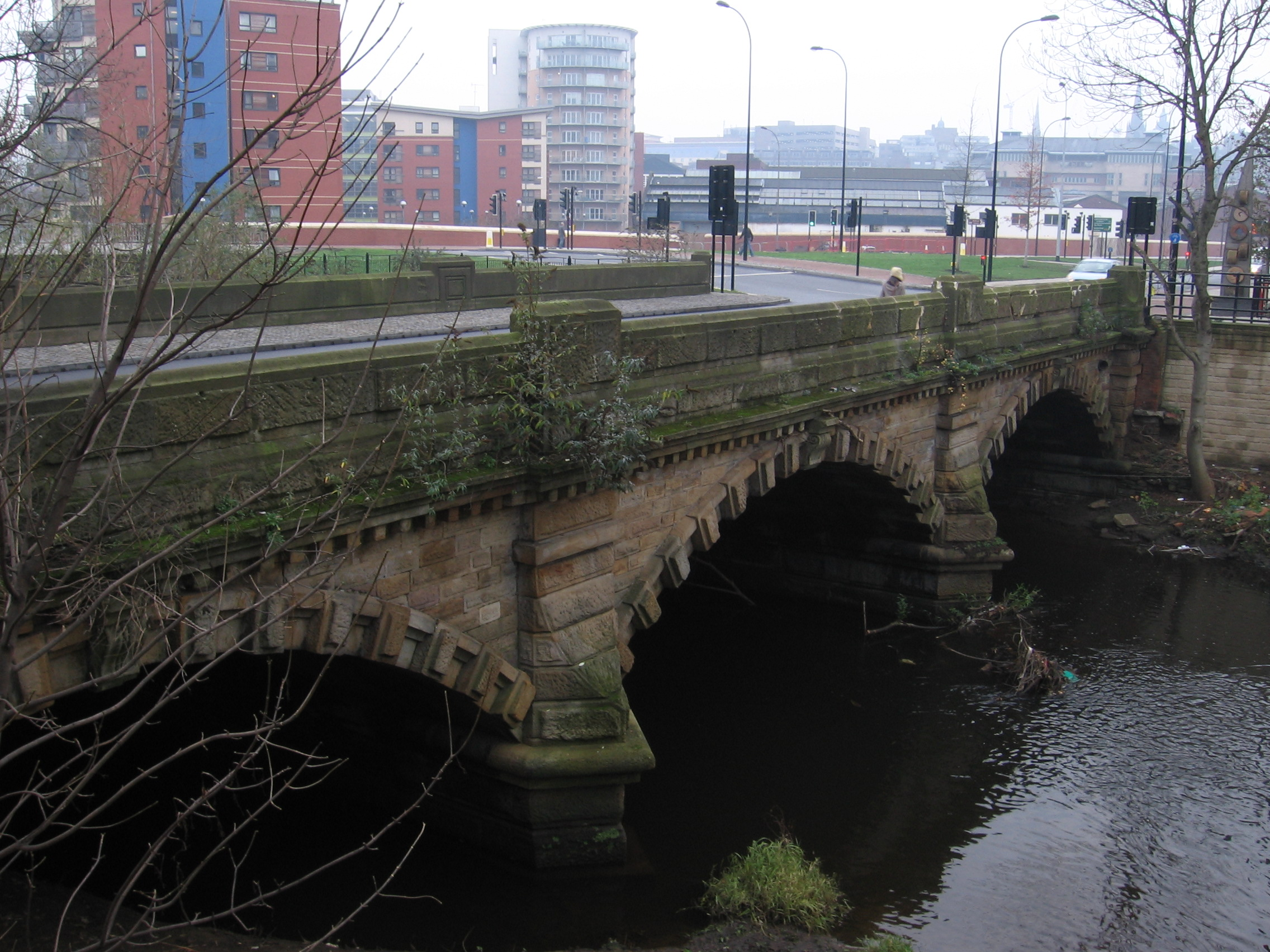
Borough Bridge

Borough bridge and Corporation Street, which crosses it, were laid out as part of the same development, and named to celebrate the incorporation of Sheffield as a borough. Samual Worth and Samual Furness Holmes were responsible for its design, and the foundation stone carries the date 12 March 1853. The bridge is built of stone, has three segmental arches, and was completed in 1856. It is a grade II listed structure. During the Great Flood, large quantities of debris built up behind it, and then caused the iron bridge below it to be swept away. Corporation Street is now part of the A61, and the bridge forms the west side of the inner relief road roundabout.

==== Iron Footbridge ====
The iron footbridge in the middle of the roundabout on the A61 inner ring road was first built as a wooden bridge around 1726. It was important, as it enabled people to reach an old road which ran to Leeds and Barnsley, passing through Pitsmoor. In 1795 it was replaced by one of the earliest iron bridges, made by Samual Walker, an ironmaster from Rotherham and was depicted by an unknown artist, circa 1840. The famous iron bridge at Coalbrookdale had been built only 15 years earlier, and there were only 7 or 8 other iron bridges in the world. It was swept away in 1864, and replaced by a new iron bridge, built at the Milton Ironworks near Elsecar. It was partially rebuilt in 1921, and the iron balustrade is marked "J Butler & Co Ltd, Stanningley Ironworks, Leeds 1921". Its function was replaced by Borough bridge when Sheffield Rolling Mills and Forge built over the path which ran from it to Millsands and Bridge Street, but it remains in place because it also carries a large water main over the river. This bridge has recently been adopted by a 'Friends Group' and has received a substantial 'make-over'. Various 'street art' installations enhance its historical interest.

==== A61 Roundabout east side bridge ====
This road bridge carries the A61 inner relief road over the river. It was built as part of a £65 million scheme to divert traffic away from the city centre, which included 0.94 miles (1.5 km) of dual carriageway running from Penistone Road to the Wicker. The road was opened on 22 November 2007 by Rosie Winterton MP.

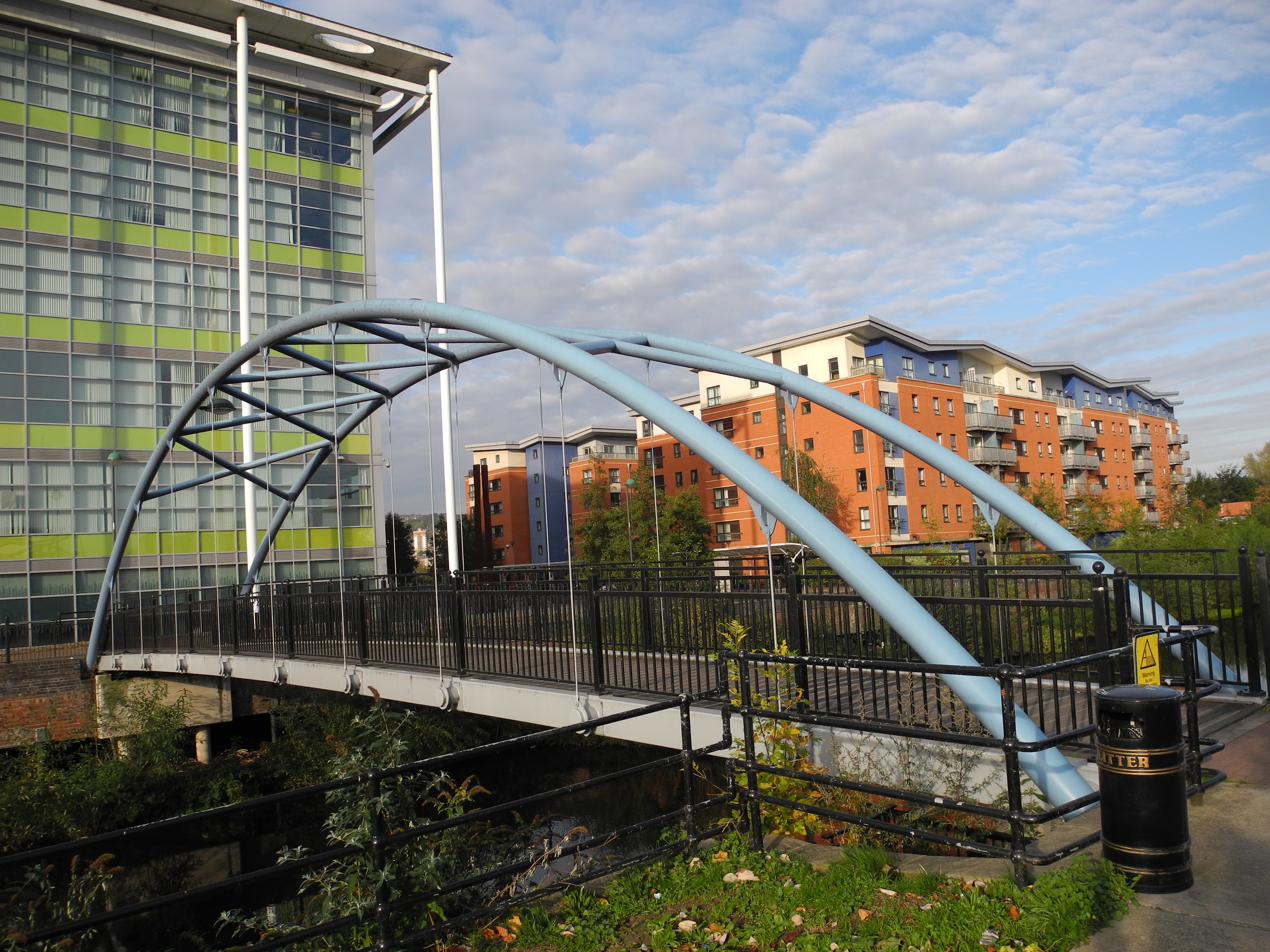
Nursery Street footbridge

==== Nursery Street Footbridge ====
This footbridge connects the re-development of the former Exchange Brewery site on the west side of the River Don with Nursery Street on the east. The bridge was built around 2005.

==== Lady's Bridge ====
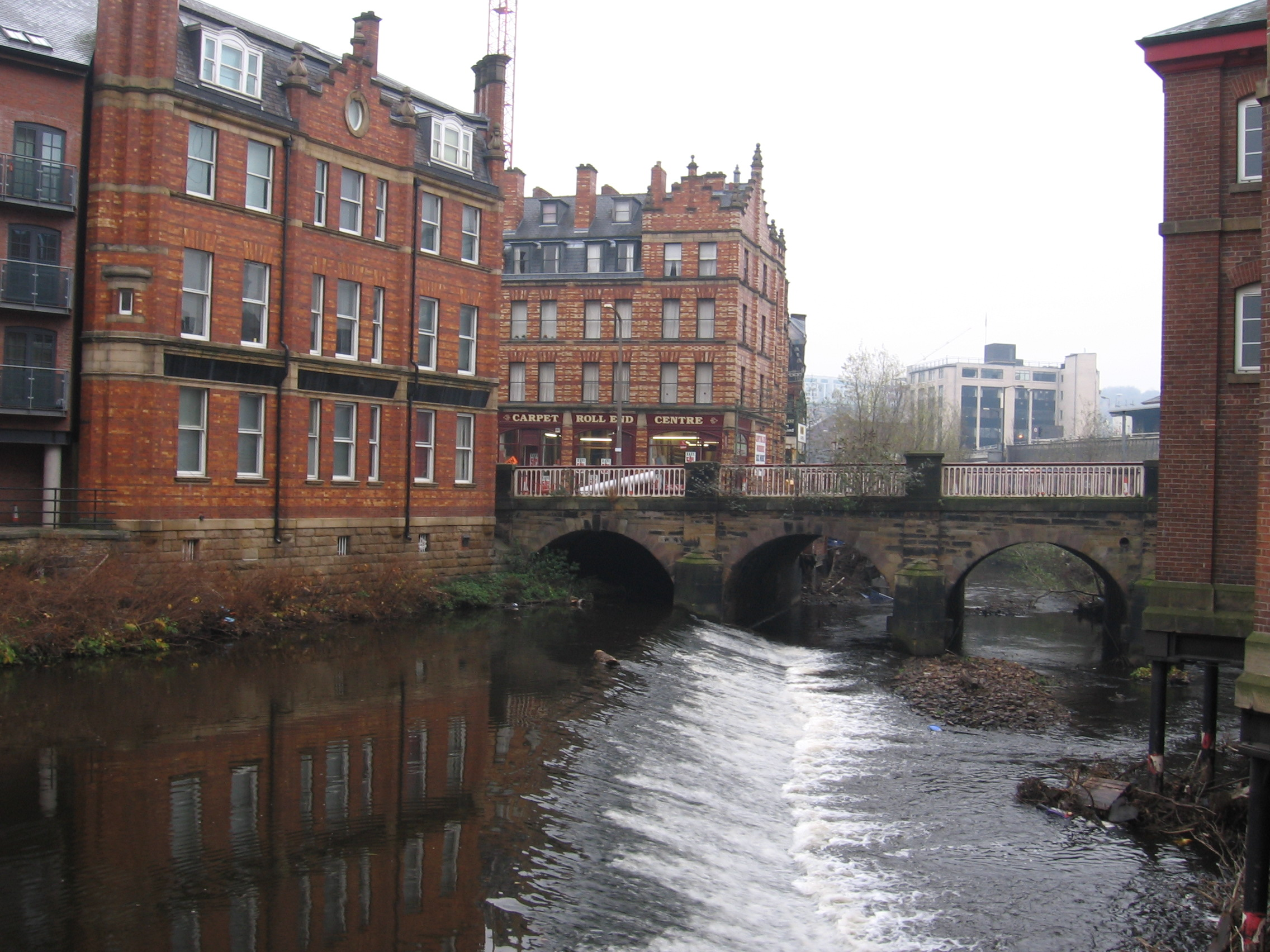
Lady's Bridge

This bridge carries the A6135 over the River Don and connects Sheffield city centre with The Wicker. Lady's Bridge is the oldest bridge crossing the Don within Sheffield, its five arches being constructed in 1485. It was widened on the south-east side in the late 19th century, was restored in the late 20th century, and is a Grade II listed structure. Wicker Weir is just upstream of Lady's Bridge.

==== Blonk Street Bridge ====
The culverted River Sheaf joins the Don beside Blonk Street bridge, named after Benjamin Blonk, who was the tenant of Castle Orchards Wheel from the 1750s to the 1770s. The three-arched bridge was built by Woodhead and Hurst between 1827 and 1828. It was altered in 1913 and has cast iron balustrades.

==== Willey Street footbridge ====
To link The Wicker with Furnival Road, a new 44-yard (40 m) steel footbridge was erected on 14 July 2010. The bridge was funded by the Environment Agency, Yorkshire Forward and the European Regional Development Fund as part of a multimillion-pound scheme to regenerate The Wicker and surrounding area. Original plans were for a 98-yard (90 m) bridge crossing the river at an angle, but the more direct route was eventually adopted. It is part of some flood defence improvements, and includes a trap for floating debris beneath it. The design is based on butterfly wings, and the project also included a new link to the Five Weirs Walk and the installation of footway lighting.

==== Derek Dooley Way Bridge ====
This bridge takes the Sheffield Inner Ring Road over the River Don. This part of the ring road was finished in 2000 as Cutlers Gate and was subsequently renamed in 2008 as Derek Dooley Way, in honour of the late Sheffielder who played football for Sheffield Wednesday before breaking his leg and going on to perform various backroom roles across the city at Sheffield United. The Derek Dooley Way named section of the ring road runs from the Parkway to the Wicker.

==== Wicker Viaduct ====
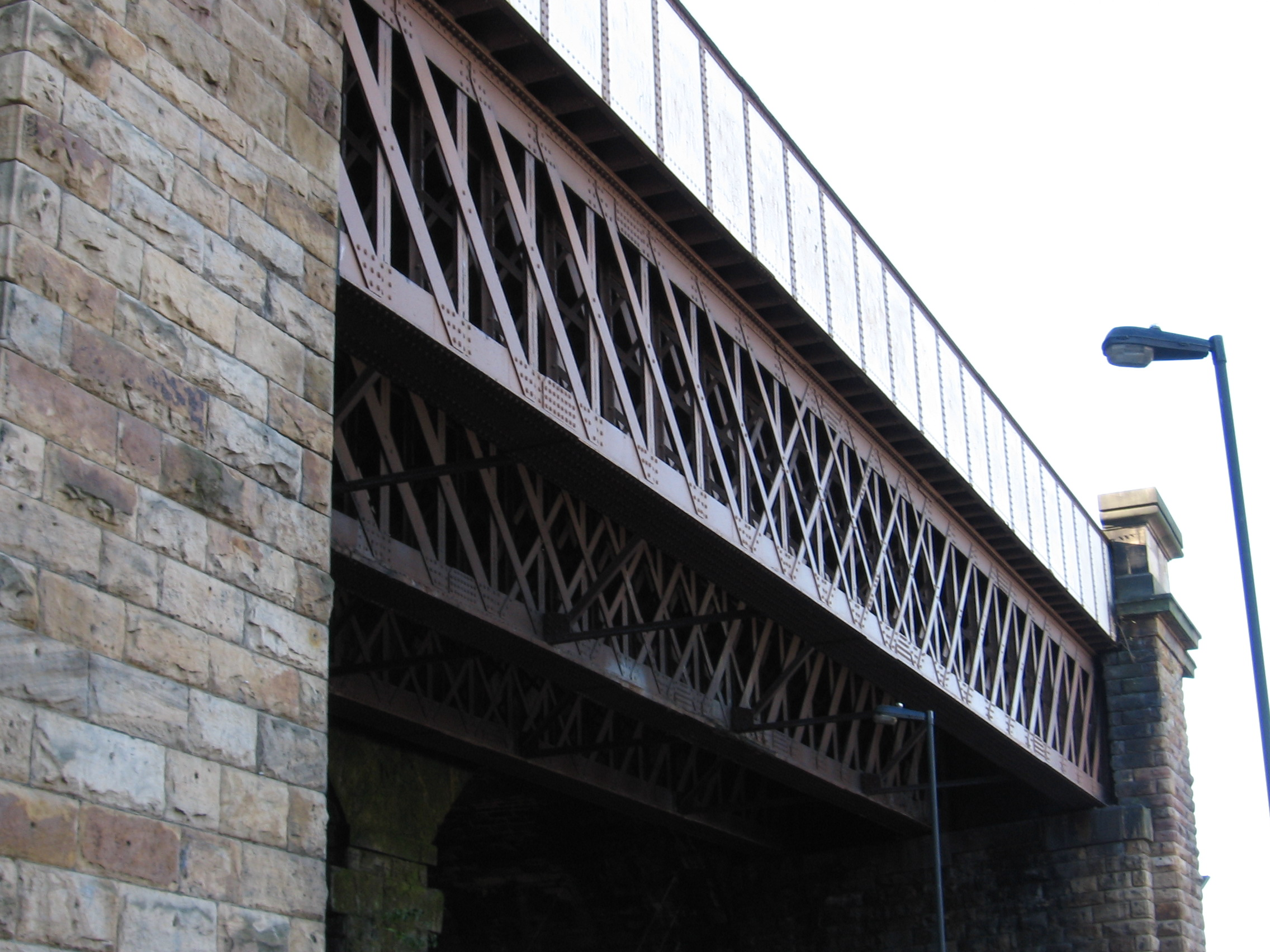
River Don span of Wicker Viaduct

The Wicker Arches are a 660-yard (600 m) railway viaduct, designed by the architects Weightman, Hadfield and Goldie to a specification by the engineer Sir John Fowler in 1848. They were built by Miller, Blackie and Shortedge, and carried the Great Central Railway to Manchester across the canal, roads and the River Don at The Wicker. The 27 southern arches are wider than the 12 to the north of the Wicker, as Sheffield Victoria railway station was built on them. The arch that takes the railway over the Don has stone abutments and a lattice girder span which was made in the late 19th century. The Cobweb Bridge is suspended from this span.

==== Cobweb Bridge ====
The Cobweb Bridge was completed in 2002. Its design was the solution to the difficult problem of how to pass the Five Weirs Walk, a waymarked cycle path and walkway which follows the river from Lady's Bridge to Meadowhall, under the massive Wicker Arches Viaduct and at the same time link one bank of the River Don to the other. Without the bridge, the footpath would have had to make a 1-mile (1.6 km) detour. Designed by Sheffield City Council's Structures Section, the entire 330-foot-long (100 m) bridge is suspended on a web of steel cables secured to the underside of the viaduct, and it is this feature which gives it its name.

==== Bailey Bridge ====
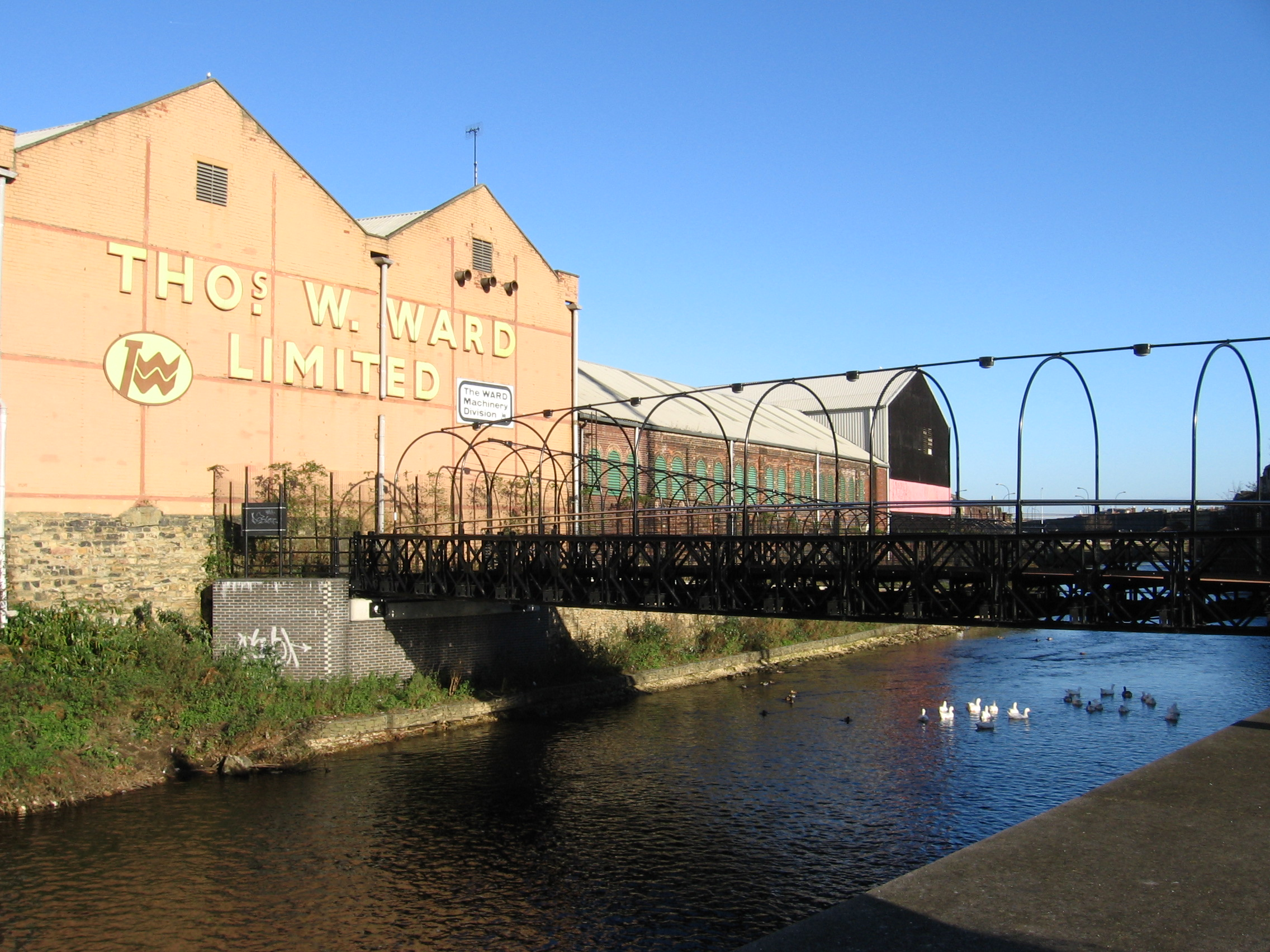
Bailey Bridge

This is part of a 550-yard (500 m) section of the Five Weirs Walk that crosses the river from Effingham Road to Attercliffe Road. The bridge here makes use of an historic Second World War Bailey bridge. The bridge was placed here on 15 October 2006, was constructed in 1945, was built probably for the D-Day landings and was chosen deliberately to celebrate the world-beating engineering design. The unique features of the invention were that a bridge capable of carrying tanks could be erected in a matter of hours from standard lightweight modules with little more than human muscle power and hand tools.

==== Midland Railway Viaduct ====
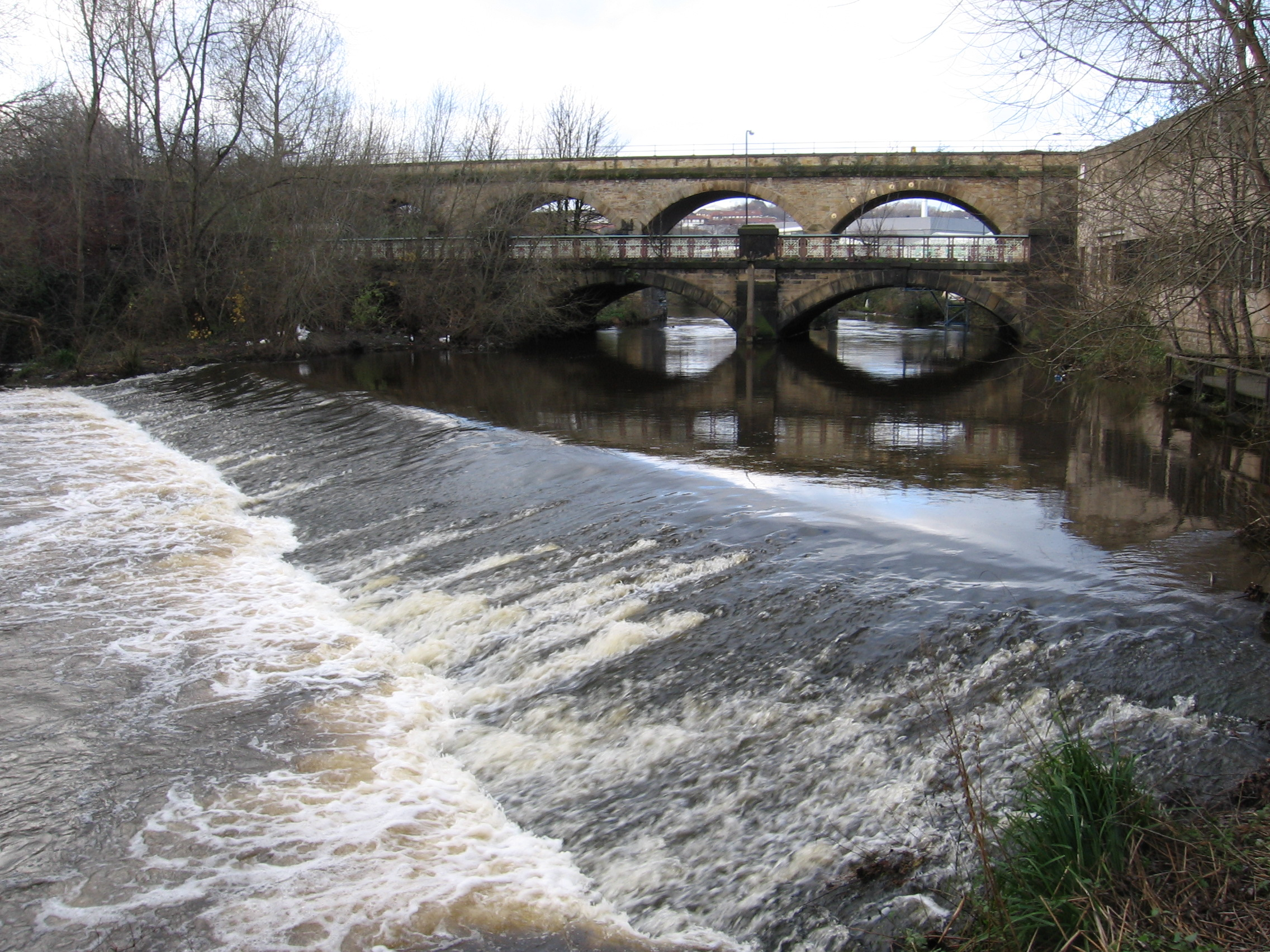
Burton Weir, Norfolk Bridge and Midland Railway Viaduct

This viaduct carries the railway from Sheffield to Meadowhall Interchange and the rest of Yorkshire. The railway was opened by the Midland Railway in 1870, at the same time as the current Sheffield Station on Pond Street replaced the Sheffield Wicker railway station. Under the north-most arch of the 4-arch viaduct is suspended a metal walkway, which is part of the Five Weirs Walk.

==== Norfolk Bridge ====
This 3-arch bridge was built in 1856 and carries Leveson Street (B6071) over the river. It was named after Henry Fitzalan-Howard, 15th Duke of Norfolk. He was a British Conservative politician and philanthropist. He served as Postmaster General between 1895 and 1900, but is best remembered for his philanthropical work, which concentrated on Roman Catholic causes and the city of Sheffield. In July 1897 he was appointed the first Lord Mayor of Sheffield. He was made an honorary Freeman of the City of Sheffield in 1900. He also donated funds for the building of the University of Sheffield and was its initial Chancellor between 1905 and 1917. Burton Weir is immediately downstream of Norfolk Bridge.

=== Bridges in Attercliffe / Brightside area ===
==== Washford Bridge ====
This carries the A6178 Attercliffe Road over the River Don. Washford or Westforth bridge, at the Sheffield end of Attercliffe, was first recorded in a will of 1535. It was rebuilt in wood in 1608 and 1647, then in stone in 1672, 1789 and 1794. In 1940 an air raid badly damaged Washford Bridge and the adjoining pub, The Bridge.

==== East Coast Road Bridge ====
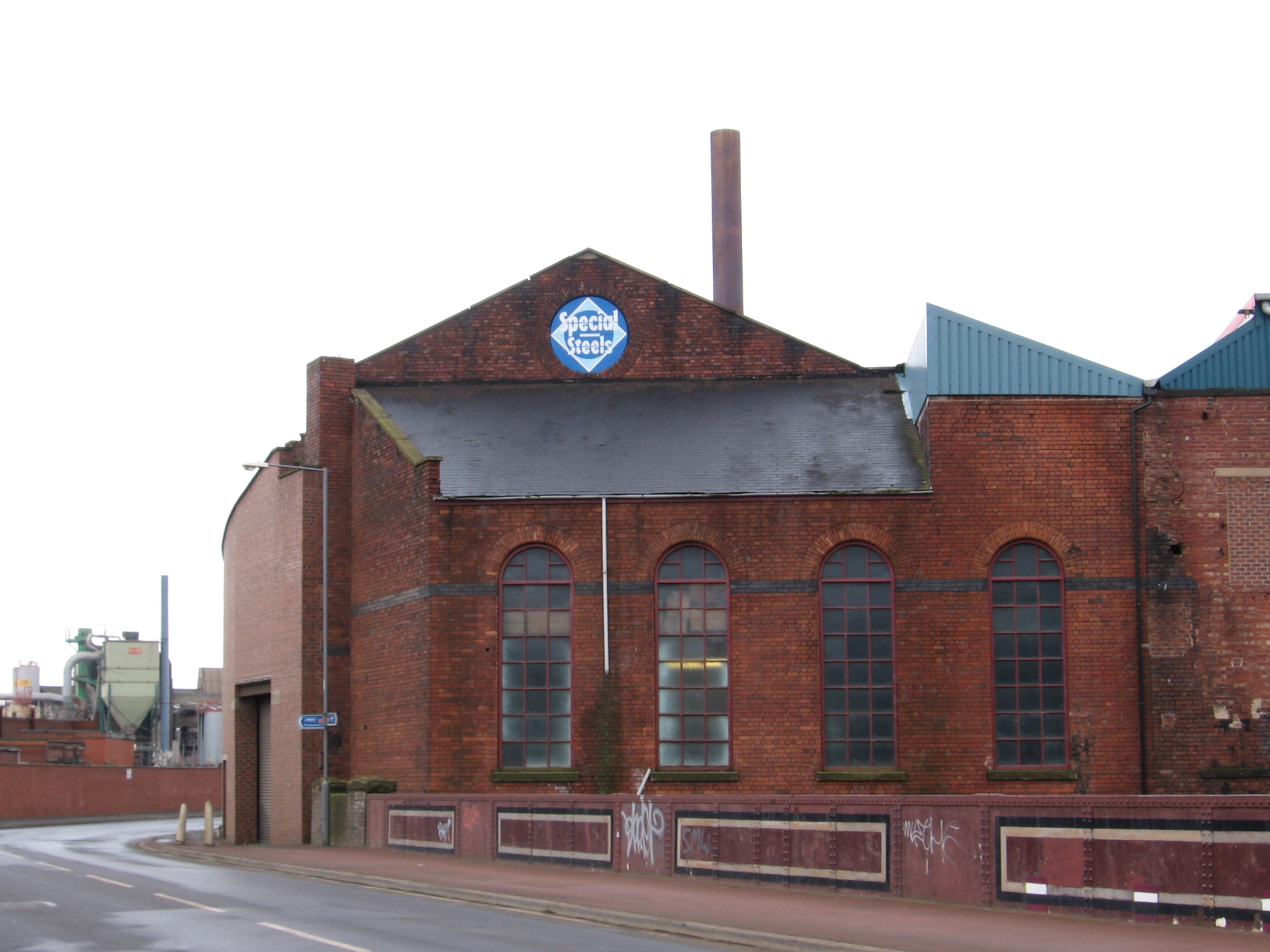
Steelworks at East Coast Road Bridge

This bridge carries East Coast Road over the River Don and connects Brightside Lane with Attercliffe Road. The bridge is of metal construction with a central pier. Sanderson's Weir is downstream of this bridge.

==== Scrapyard railway bridge ====
This bridge carries a railway siding leading to the metal scrap yard on East Coast Road. Currently operated by European Metal Recycling, the scrapyard was previously known as Cooper's Metals and Marple & Gillott and is a specialist in dismantling railway vehicles.

==== Stevenson Road Bridge ====
This bridge carries Stevenson Road over the River Don and connects Brightside Lane with Attercliffe Road. It was named after one of the owners of the Attercliffe Steam Corn Mill. The bridge was strengthened in 2004, so that HGV vehicles could continue to use it.

==== Newhall Road Bridge ====
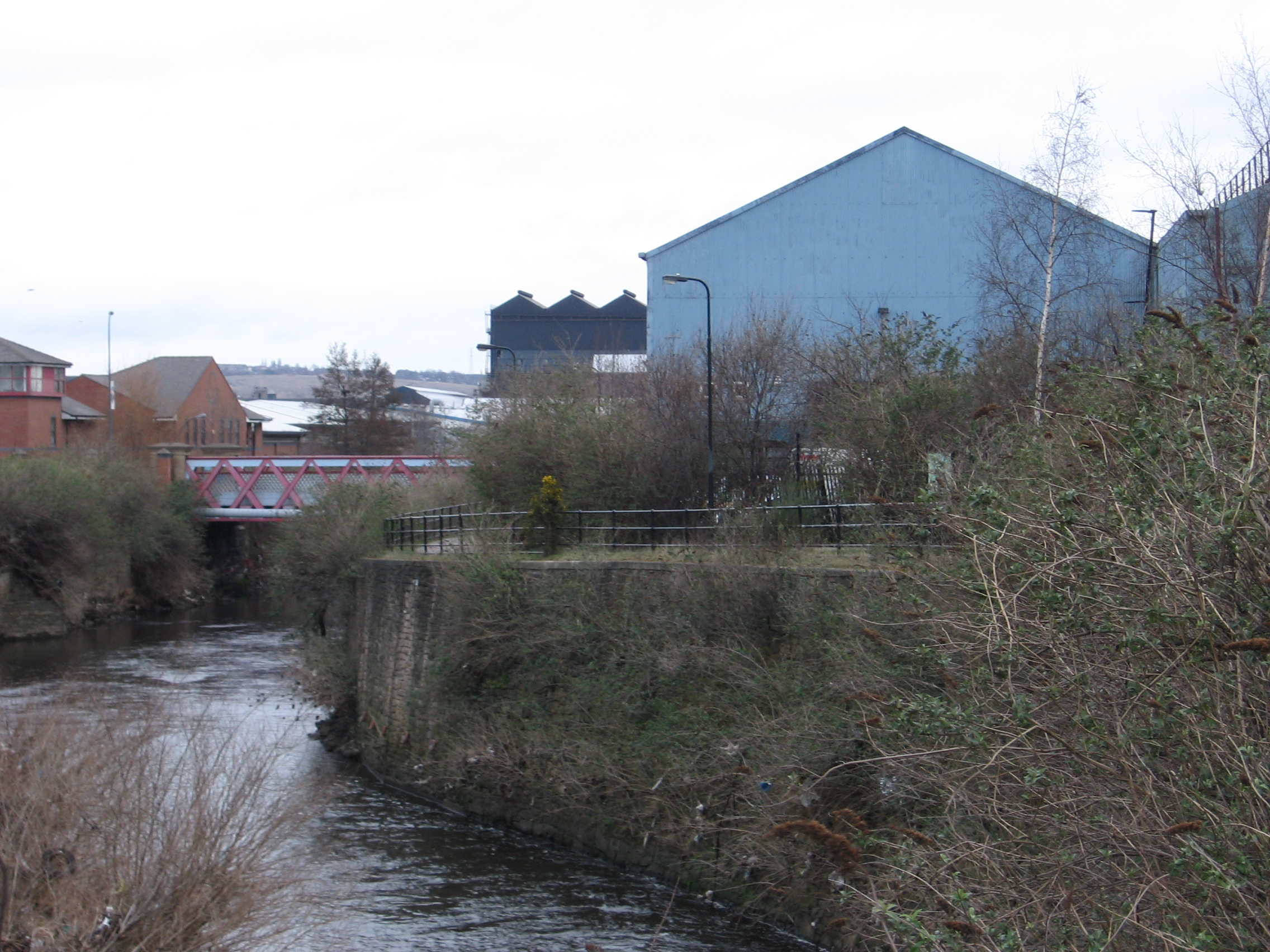
Newhall Road Bridge

This bridge carries Newhall Road (B6083) over the River Don and connects Brightside Lane with Attercliffe Road. In the 17th century, Newhall Road Bridge was a packhouse bridge in a very rural setting. The road takes its name from "a handsome red-brick house known as Newhall, which stood where in later years Newhall School was built". The house was inhabited by the Fell family. The Fells were a family of wealthy iron masters, dating from the 17th century. They were known to have gained their wealth and position from the oldest iron works in Sheffield, named the Attercliffe Forge.

==== Amberley Street footbridge ====
This bridge enables the Five Weirs Walk to cross the River Don. To the west of the bridge, the walk follows the banks of the Don for several miles, while to the east, it goes on a lengthy diversion along roads away from the river to avoid the Sheffield Forgemasters steelworks which occupy the land on both sides of the Don. There is some debate about whether the original wooden Abyssinia Bridge (see section below) crossed the river at the same place as the current Amberley Street footbridge.

==== Abyssinia Bridge ====
This bridge carries the A6102 Sheffield Outer Ring Road dual carriageway (Hawke Street / Jansen Street) over the River Don. The bridge got its name from the 1868 invasion of Abyssinia by British troops. The first Abyssinia Bridge was built of wood in 1868. It was later replaced by a metal bridge which remained the footpath link between Attercliffe and Brightside until Hawke Street and Jansen Street were joined by a road bridge in 1908. There is some debate about whether the original wooden Abyssinia Bridge crossed the river at the same place as the current Amberley Street footbridge.

==== Forgemaster works bridges ====
There are three bridges (two road and one pipe) in that section of the Don between Abyssinia Bridge and Brightside Weir which is inaccessible to the public. They are used to connect the Sheffield Forgemasters steelworks which occupy the land on both sides of the Don.

==== Weedon Street Bridge ====
Also known as Brightside Bridge, this carries Weedon Street, which links Brightside Lane with Attercliffe Common. This bridge is downstream of Brightside Weir. The bridge is mentioned in the records of the Great Sheffield Flood of 1864 as follows: "The watchman on duty near Brightside Bridge had a very narrow escape. When passing the bridge he was startled by a singular sound as though the steam from a distant engine had suddenly been let off, and immediately after the flood came rushing down. The water rose rapidly over the bridge and the road. To escape he mounted the wall, intending to walk along it to some place of safety; but in another moment he felt the wall tremble beneath him. He then jumped off it, and rushed through the waters nearly breast high towards the Midland railway, which he succeeded in reaching, and down which he walked to Sheffield".

=== Bridges in Meadowhall / Tinsley area ===
==== Sheffield District Railway bridge ====
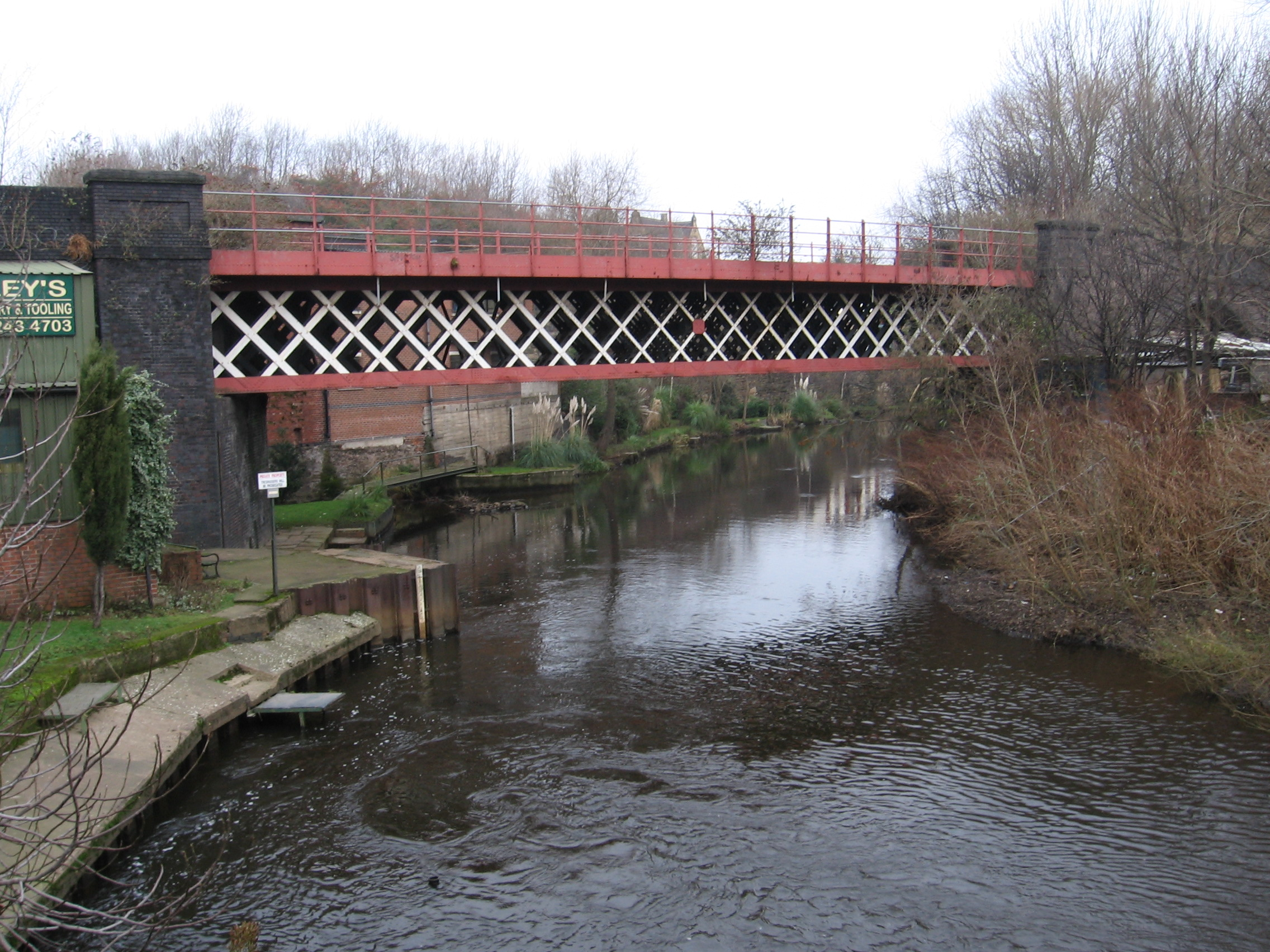
Sheffield District Railway bridge

This single-span metal bridge carried the Sheffield District Railway over the River Don. It was opened in 1900, was integrated into the LNER in 1923 and, in British Rail days, it connected Tinsley Marshalling Yard with the Midland Main Line at Brightside Junction. The railway lines were lifted in 1999, but the bridge was still intact in 2013.

==== Meadowhall Way (SW) bridge ====
This was opened at the same time as the Meadowhall Shopping Centre.

==== Meadowhall works bridge ====
This bridge provides a pedestrian route between Meadowhall Road and that part of the Five Weirs Walk that skirts the Meadowhall Shopping Centre. Erected by Newton Chambers & Co Ltd, Thorncliffe Ironworks, the bridge originally provided access to one of the works (Dunford Hadfields, Shardlows or Arthur Lees) that used to occupy the shopping centre site. This bridge is just downstream of Hadfield's Weir.

==== Meadowhall Interchange footbridge ====
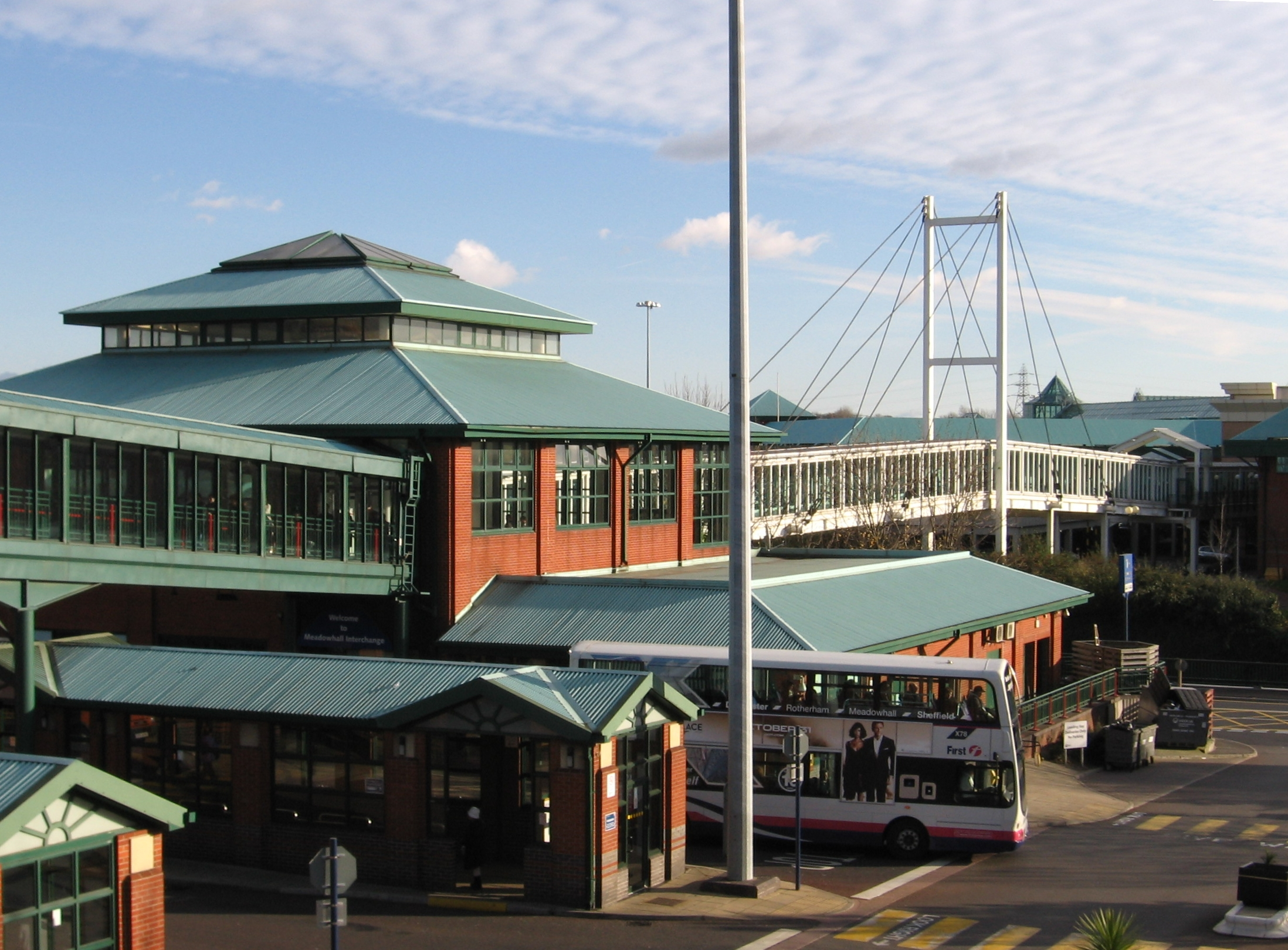
Meadowhall Interchange footbridge

This cable-stayed enclosed footbridge connects Meadowhall Interchange with the Meadowhall Shopping Centre. It provides pedestrian access to Meadowhall from the Wincobank area of Sheffield, the railway station, the tram station and the bus station. The footbridge crosses the A6109 Meadowhall Road and the Five Weirs Walk, as well as the River Don.

==== Meadowhall Way (N) bridge ====
These two bridges were opened at the same time as the Meadowhall Shopping Centre.

==== Meadowhall Coach Park bridges ====
These two bridges (foot and road) were opened at the same time as the Meadowhall Shopping Centre. They connect the coach park and overflow car park to the shopping centre.

==== Supertram Bridge ====
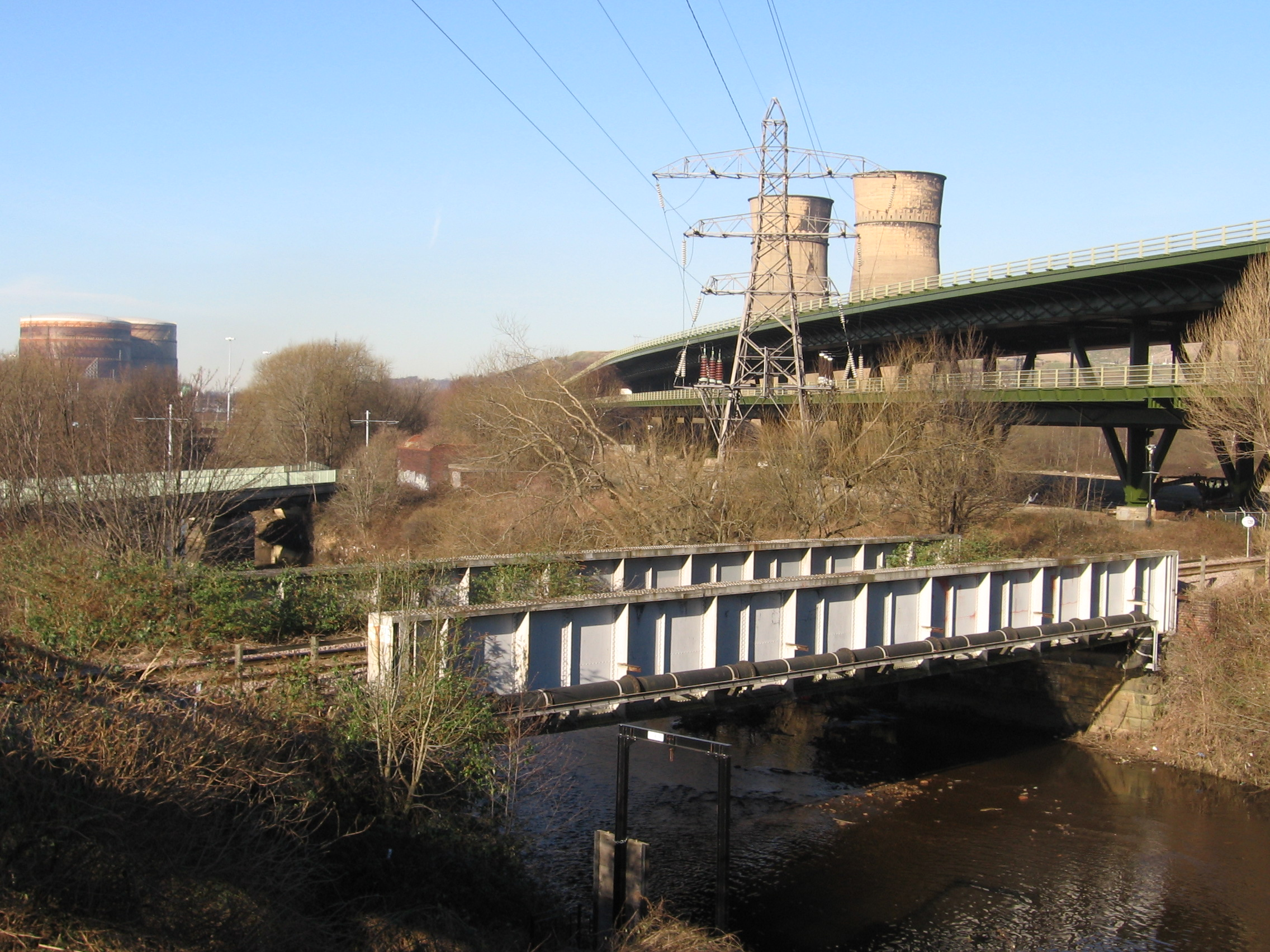
Tram, railway and M1 bridges at Tinsley

This bridge carries the Sheffield Supertram line over the River Don. The Fitzalan Square to Meadowhall section of the tram network was opened on 21 March 1994.

==== South Yorkshire Railway bridge ====
This bridge carries the Sheffield to Rotherham freight-only railway line. The railway was originally part of the South Yorkshire Railway, which later became part of the Great Central Railway.

==== M1 Tinsley Viaduct ====
Tinsley Viaduct carries the M1 London to Leeds motorway and the A631 road over the River Don. This two-tier viaduct is over 0.6 miles (1 km) long and was opened in 1968, at a cost of £6 million. It was strengthened in 1983 and again in 2006. The 2006 refurbishment involved the addition of 2,500 tonnes of steel and 3,500 tonnes of reinforced concrete, took three years to complete and cost £81 million.

==== Blackburn Meadows bridge ====
This works bridge may once have provided road access to Blackburn Meadows Power Station. The area around this bridge would have been affected by the Halfpenny Link Road development proposed in 2005.

==== Halfpenny Bridge ====
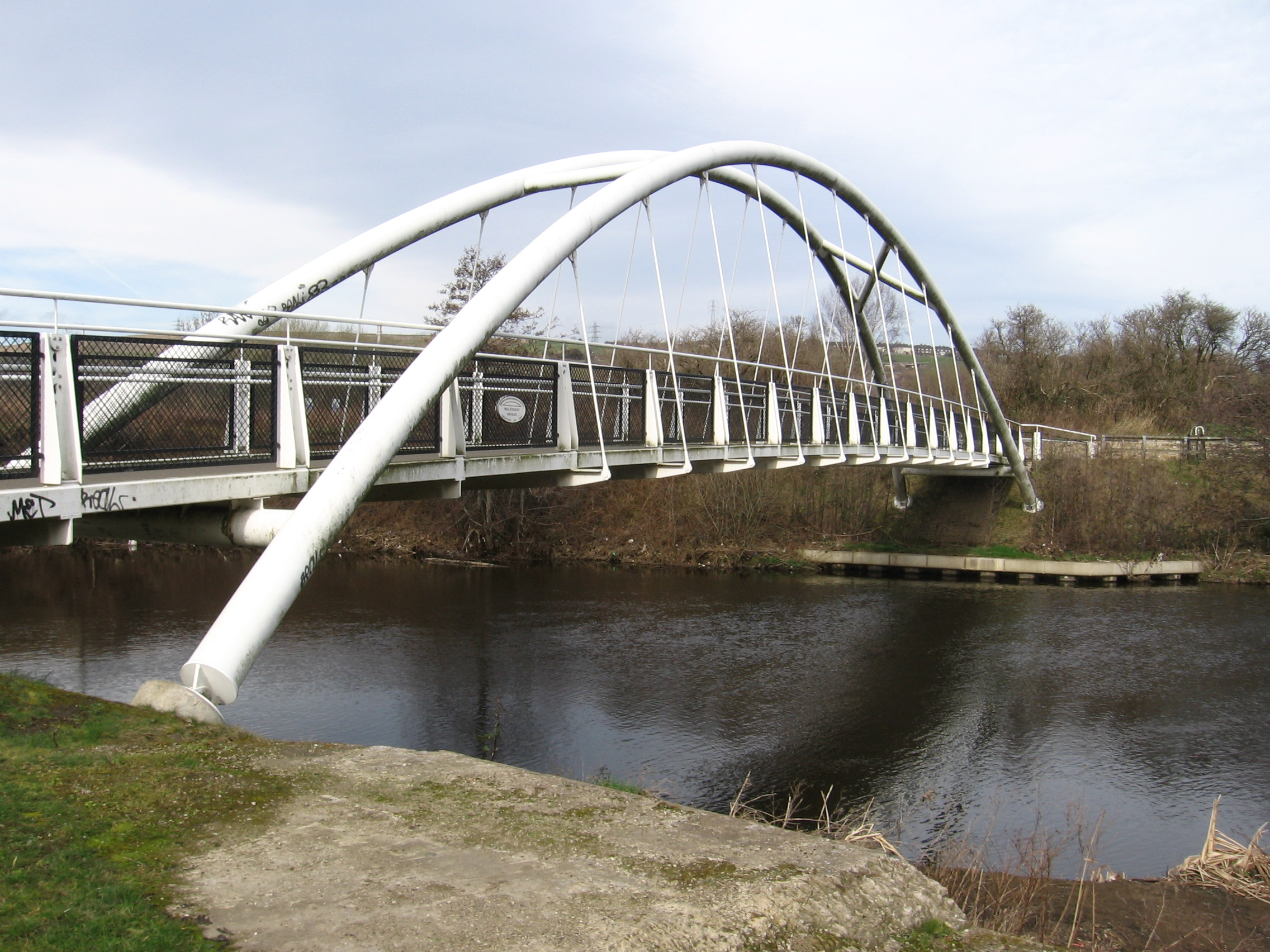
Halfpenny Bridge

This bridge carries the Trans-Pennine Trail over the final non-navigable section of the River Don. The Sheffield Canal joins the Don immediately downstream of this footbridge. A century ago it would have cost half a penny for anyone to use the ferry crossing the Tinsley waterway. But 70 years ago, the ferry – and the charge – was scrapped with the building of a bridge. On 15 October 2001, the current bridge was opened to replace the older unsafe bridge. The current bridge is still named Halfpenny Bridge, but cost half a million pounds. The bridge is of steel bowstring construction, with a 49-yard (45 m) span. The Sheffield Halfpenny Bridge is not to be confused with the Halfpenny Bridge near Lechlade in Gloucestershire, which marks the start of the navigable River Thames.

== Flora and fauna ==
Fig trees grow on a stretch of the river bank in Sheffield. The seeds do not normally germinate in the English climate, but the use of river water for quenching hot metal in some of the foundries resulted in water temperatures rising above 20 deg C. At these temperatures, germination occurred. Most of the trees are over 50 years old, and the demise of such industry along the river has reduced water temperatures, so that there is no evidence of new trees growing.

The industrial nature of the region led to a severe pollution problem for the river, but efforts to improve the water quality and habitat have met with some success, as salmon have been reported in the river near Doncaster. In 2013 a fish pass was built at a weir on the Don at Meadowhall. The weir had been a barrier to the passage of fish for 150 years prior to the construction of the fish pass. It was also planned to construct a fish pass at Sprotbrough weir. Grayling, barble, chub and dace, as well as salmon are expected to benefit from the construction of a series of wiers. In 2020 a fish pass was built at Masbrough Weir, Forge Island, in Rotherham. It is the last of 18 obstructions along the River Don to be made passable by salmon, enabling them to swim to their spawning grounds in Sheffield. The completion of the Masbrough Weir fish pass and a fish pass at Sanderson's Weir, in Sheffield means the fish have a route from the North Sea to Sheffield. The project to open-up the river to salmon took 20 years to complete.

== See also ==
- 2019 United Kingdom floods
- Rivers of the United Kingdom
- River Don Navigation, for information on the navigable part of the River Don, east of Tinsley.
- List of lattice girder bridges in the United Kingdom

== Bibliography ==
- Amisah, S.; Cowx, I. G. (1999). Response of the fish populations of the River Don to water quality and habitat improvements (PDF). Elsevier: Environmental Pollution, Issue 108. Archived from the original (PDF) on 4 March 2016.
- Ball, Christine; Crossley, David; Flavell, Neville (2006). Water Power on the Sheffield Rivers: Second Edition. South Yorkshire Industrial History Society. ISBN 978-0-9556644-0-3.
- Cumberlidge, Jane (2009). Inland Waterways of Great Britain 8th Ed. Imray Laurie Norie and Wilson. ISBN 978-1-84623-010-3.
- Hadfield, Charles (1973). The Canals of Yorkshire and North East England (Vol 2). David and Charles. ISBN 0-7153-5975-4.
- Harman, R. (2004). Sheffield: Pevsner City Guides. Yale University Press. ISBN 978-0-300-10585-8.
- Harrison, Samuel (1864). A Complete History of the Great Flood at Sheffield on March 11 & 12, 1864. Sheffield: S Harrison, Sheffield Times Office.
- Hunter, Joseph (1819). Hallamshire. The History and Topography of the Parish of Sheffield in the County of York. London: Lackington, Hughes, Harding, Mayor & Jones. (wikisource)
- Nicholson (2006). Nicholson Guides Vol 6: Nottingham, York and the North East. Harper Collins Publishing. ISBN 0-00-721114-7.
- Rennison, Robert William (1996). Civil Engineering Heritage:Northern England. Thomas Telford. ISBN 978-0-7277-2518-9.
- Skempton, Sir Alec (2002). A Biographical Dictionary of Civil Engineers in Great Britain and Ireland: Vol 1: 1500 to 1830. Thomas Telford. ISBN 0-7277-2939-X.
- Smith, Martin (2007). The Great Flood. At Heart. ISBN 978-1-84547-150-7.
- Willan, Prof T. S. (1965). The Early History of the Don Navigation. Manchester University Press.
