= Ann Eliza Longden =

Mayor Longden

Ann Eliza Longden (1869 – 12 August 1952) was a British politician, the first woman to serve as Lord Mayor of Sheffield.

Living at Wadsley Grove, Longden joined the Conservative Party, and in 1904 she stood unsuccessfully to become a Poor Law Guardian in Hillsborough. Her husband died in 1922, after which she took over as managing director of his business, the Longden Timber Company. Later in the year she finally won election to Sheffield City Council.

In 1936/37, Longden served as Lord Mayor of Sheffield, the first woman to hold the position. Her daughter Mary served as her Lady Mayoress. Her son John also became a councillor, and served as Lord Mayor in his own right at the end of the decade.

Longden was elected as an alderman in 1938. She served as president of the women's section of the Sheffield Citizen's Association, and its successor, the women's council of the Municipal Progressive Party, and also president of the women's section of the Hillsborough Conservative Association. In 1949, Longden was granted the Freedom of the City of Sheffield, the first woman to be given this award.

Civic offices
Preceded by Frank Thraves	Lord Mayor of Sheffield; 1936–1937	Succeeded by Ernest Rowlinson
