= Douglas Vickers =

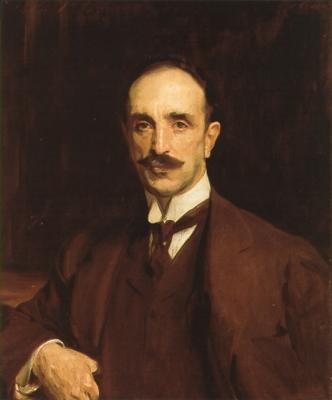
- Portrait of Vickers, by John Singer Sargent, 1914

Member of Parliament for Sheffield Hallam
- In office 1918–1922
- Preceded by: H. A. L. Fisher
- Succeeded by: Sir Frederick Sykes

Personal details
- Born: 24 July 1861 Sheffield, West Riding of Yorkshire, England
- Died: 23 November 1937 (aged 76) Mayfair, London, England
- Party: Conservative
- Spouse: Katharine Adelaide Chetwynd (m. 1893)
- Children: 4
- Parent(s): Frances Mary Douglas Vickers; Thomas Edward Vickers

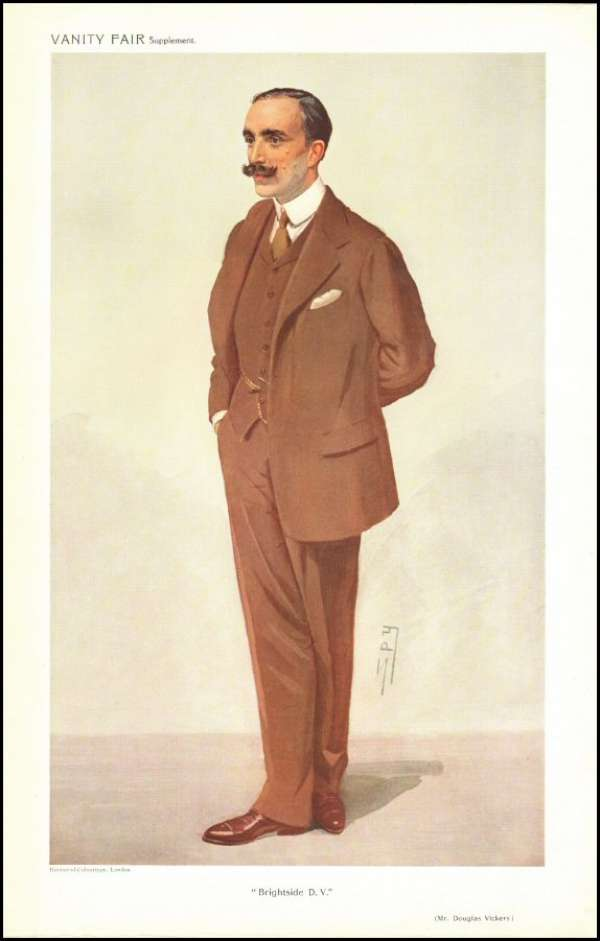
Vickers as caricatured by Spy (Leslie Ward) in Vanity Fair, December 1909

Douglas Vickers (24 July 1861 – 23 November 1937) was an English industrialist and politician. His family owned the famous Sheffield firm Vickers, Sons & Co. Ltd.

== Early life ==
Vickers was born on 24 July 1861 in Sheffield, West Riding of Yorkshire. He was a son of Frances Mary (née Douglas) Vickers (1841–1904) and Colonel Thomas Edward Vickers (1833–1915). His father commissioned John Singer Sargent to paint portraits of the family. Douglas' portrait was painted in 1914.

== Career ==
He became Director of the family business in 1897, and was Master Cutler of Sheffield in 1908. He was elected as a Conservative MP for Sheffield Hallam in 1918, and held the seat until 1922.

In 1918, he succeeded his uncle as chairman of the armament firm Vickers Ltd. and served in that role until 1926 making "many valuable contributions to metallurgical science and provided funds for the investigation of new treatments for tuberculosis." He retired in 1926 when the firm merged with Sir W G Armstrong Whitworth & Co Ltd. to become Vickers Armstrongs, Ltd.

== Personal life ==
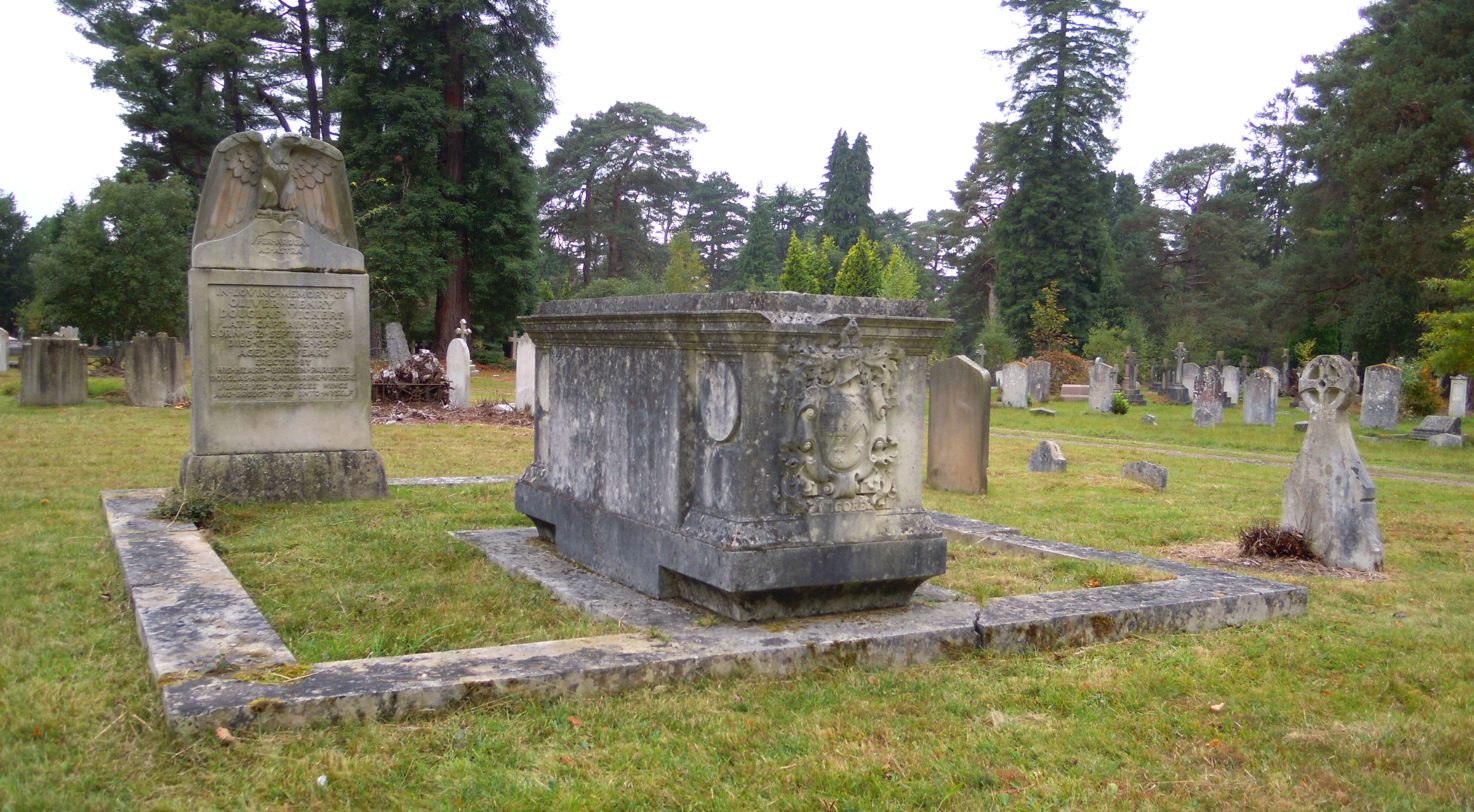
The Vickers family plot at Brookwood Cemetery

In 1893, Vickers was married to Katharine Adelaide Chetwynd (1862–1944), a daughter of Capt. Hon. Henry Weyland Chetwynd and a granddaughter of Richard Chetwynd, 6th Viscount Chetwynd. Katharine's brother later succeeded as the 8th Viscount Chetwynd. Together, Douglas and Katharine were the parents of four children:

- Oliver Henry Douglas (1898–1928), who married Barbara Kathleen Wallace, a daughter of Falconer Lewis Wallace, DL.
- Felicity Ida Vickers (1901–1901), who died in infancy.
- Sholto Douglas Vickers (1902–1939), who married Princess Olga Alexandrovna Galitzine.
- Angus Douglas Vickers (1904–1990), a Lt. Col. in the British Army who married Phyllis Maud Francis.

He died on 23 November 1937 in Mayfair, London. He is buried in the family plot in Brookwood Cemetery.

Parliament of the United Kingdom
Preceded by H. A. L. Fisher	Member of Parliament for Sheffield Hallam; 1918–1922	Succeeded by Sir Frederick Sykes
