= Harold Warters Jackson =

Lord Mayor of Sheffield in 1930

Sir Harold Warters Jackson (5 April 1883 – 4 December 1972) was an English solicitor who served as Lord Mayor of Sheffield in 1930. He was knighted in 1952 for political and public services in Sheffield.

== Career ==
Jackson graduated from the University of London with a Bachelor of Laws degree in 1903. He served a clerkship with a Sheffield law firm and in 1904 was admitted with honours to the Roll of Solicitors of the Supreme Court. He was elected to the Sheffield City Council for the first time in 1911, became an alderman in 1929 and Lord Mayor the following year, and retired in 1966. He was awarded the Freedom of the City of Sheffield in 1945.
