= Globe Works =

Building in Sheffield, South Yorkshire, England

Coordinates: 53.3899°N 1.478°W

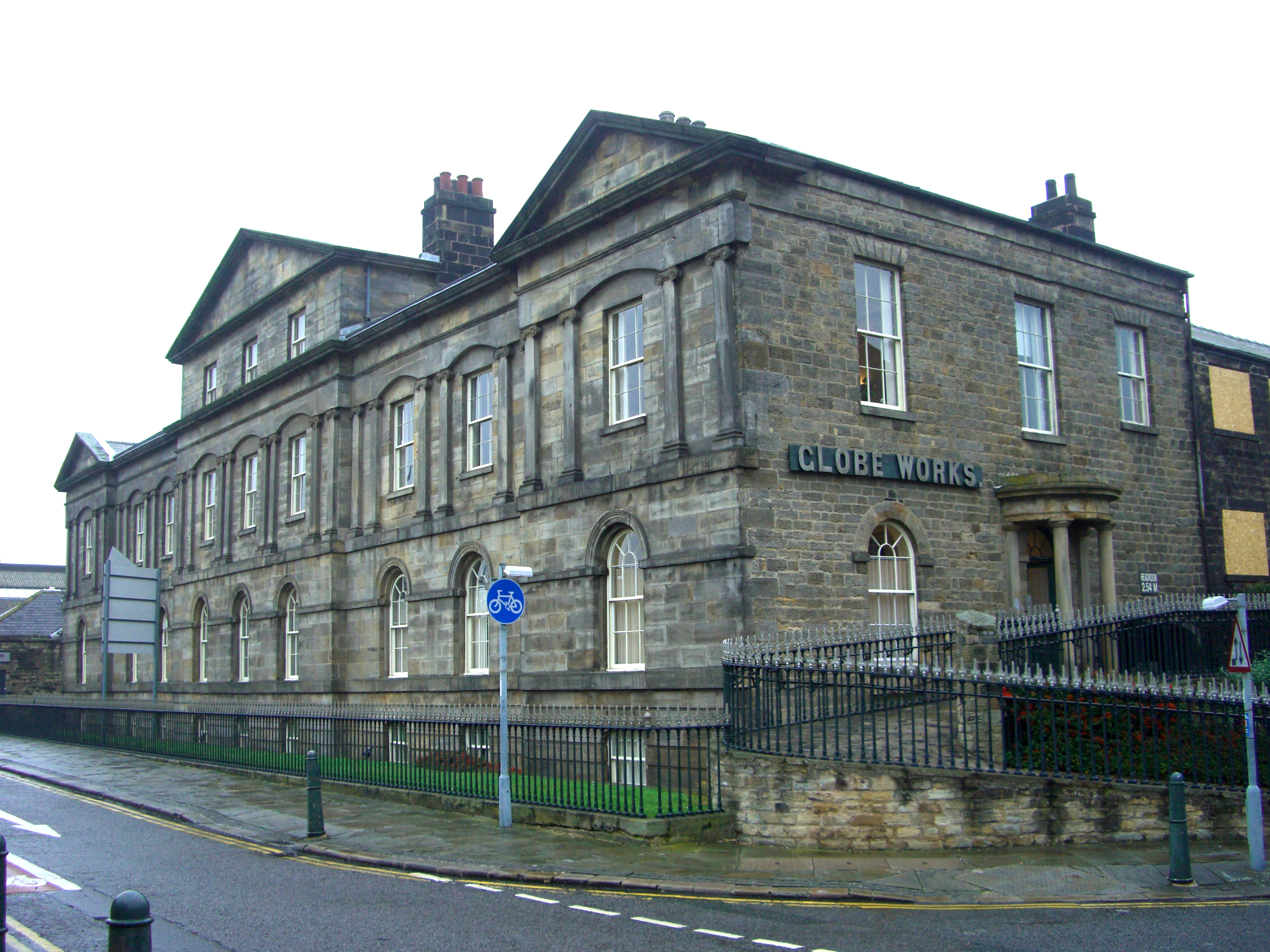

The Globe Works are a former cutlery factory situated in the City of Sheffield, South Yorkshire, England on Penistone Road in the suburb of Neepsend. The Works are a Grade II* Listed Building which in the late 1980s were renovated to provide modern office space. It is part of the Kelham Island Conservation Area.

== History and architecture ==
The Globe Works were built in 1825 by the architects Henry and William Ibbotson for the edge tool manufacturers Ibbotson & Roebank. The Works are one of England's oldest surviving cutlery and tool factories and were possibly the world's first purpose built cutlery factory. When opened the Works produced steel, tools and cutlery on the one site in an integrated process driven by steam power.

The Works has an ornamental façade frontage built in coarse square stone and brick in the Classical Revival style. The façade has two storeys with nine windows on each storey, the middle section is pedimented and this gives an additional half a storey to this section. Behind the ornamental façade were furnaces, a manager's residence and a courtyard which was surrounded by many small workshops in which numerous little mesters were employed. The owner had a house integrated into the design at the southern end of the Works and this is the probable reason for the grandness of the façade. The entrance to the house was on the side wall and had a pillared porch, today this is the main entrance and reception for the entire building.

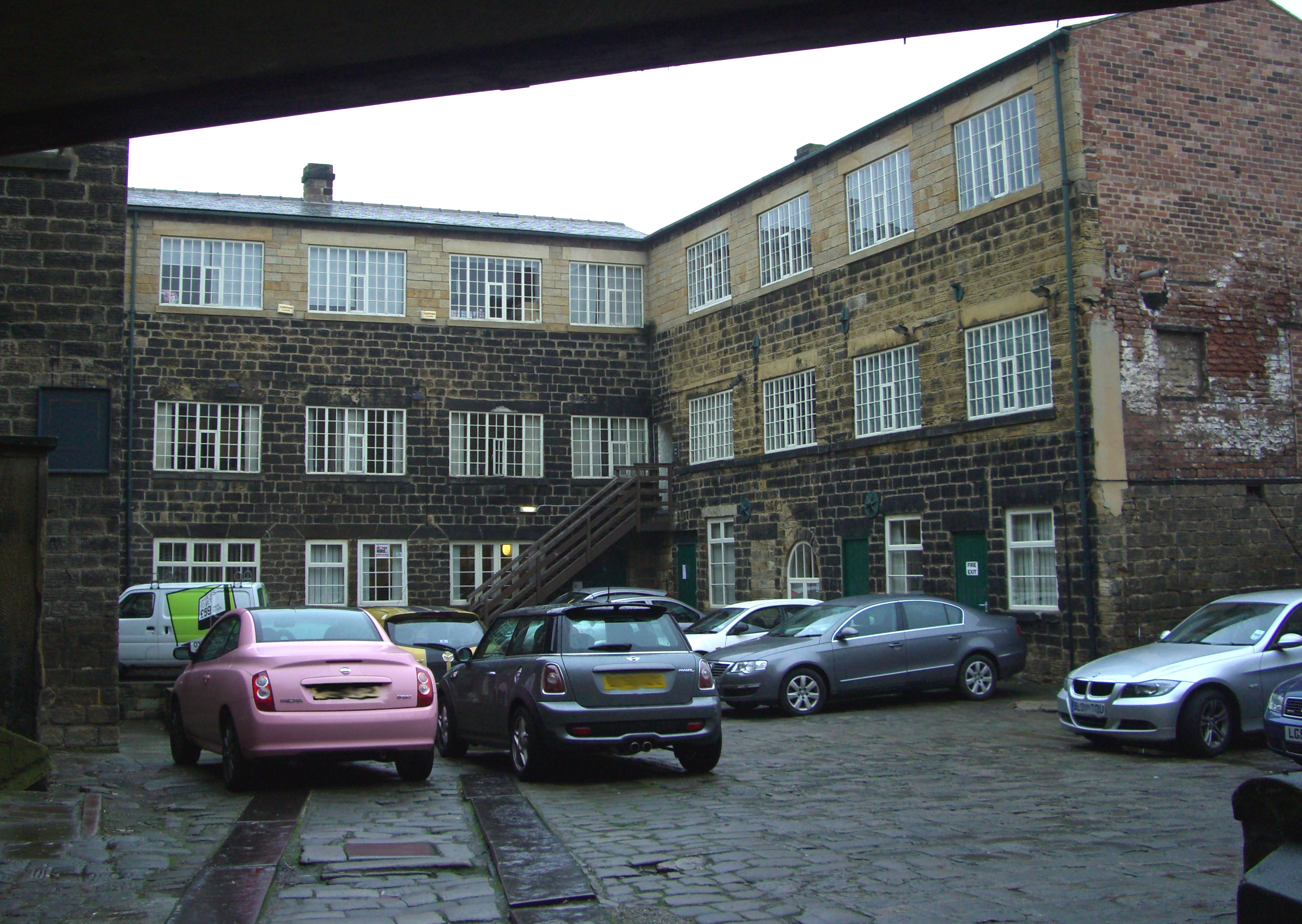
The courtyard behind the facade is lined by buildings which were formerly cutlery workshops.

The industrialist Charles Cammell worked at the Globe Works for Ibbotson Brothers between 1830 and 1837, before leaving to set up his own firm of Johnson, Cammell and Company with Thomas Johnson; this firm later became part of the Cammell Laird group. Another well known industrialist William Edgar Allen worked at the Globe Works as a young man before setting up the Edgar Allen and Company steelworks in 1867. The Globe Works received considerable damage during industrial unrest between employers and unions in 1843 when a bomb was planted by two members of the Saw Grinders Union. In 1852 John Walters moved his business from the city centre to the Globe Works, his factory made table knives, spring knives, steel and tools and specialised in making Bowie knives for the American market. Between 1865 and 1910 the Works were occupied by Unwin & Rodgers. The Works later became an all-purpose factory and warehouse. The entrance to the factories surrounding the courtyard was under an enormous archway to the right and below the portcullis of the original house. This was originally built to allow horses and carts/carriages into the cobbled courtyard. The upstairs packing rooms and office had to be accessed by an outside staircase.

As well as producing cutlery, scissors and silverware, Thomas Bishop was granted his own assay mark in 1830 to produce Old Sheffield Plate (copper coated with silver by fusion). From 1840–1860 nickel silver gradually superseded the use of copper, and articles were produced by the aid of both processes; though the bodies of the larger pieces continued to be constructed of fused plated metal, the other parts were subjected to the process of electro deposition. "Guide to Marks of Origin on British and Irish Silver Plate from Mid 16th Century to the year 1950 and Old Sheffield Plate Makers' Marks 1743 - 1860" compiled by Frederick Bradbury F.S.A.(1950). This was done within the Globe Works premises. The business was eventually transferred to his son George Bishop and became George Bishop and Sons. The 1939–45 war intervened, George Bishop retired and when his sons returned from war duties and rejoined the firm it was called Sanders and Bowers, Globe Works, and along with silverware, produced "Friar Edge" knives to complement the forks and spoons which were sold in sets of six or canteens. The firm was then run by George Bishop's sons—Cyril Bishop and Ron Bishop, along with Albert Sanders and Ron Sanders. Ron Bishop eventually left and one of the Sanders died. By this time a large percentage of contracts were exported to Australia and US. The firm continued until 30 June 1976 when Cyril Bishop died. At this time it was under negotiation to be compulsorily purchased by Sheffield City Council. Arthur Price of Birmingham bought the patent to "Friar Edge" knives.

== Restoration and present day ==
In 1970, Sheffield Town Planning Committee called for the Globe Works to be removed from the register of listed buildings so it could be bulldozed to make way for an urban motorway, however the request was rejected. The Works became derelict in the 1970s when it was extensively damaged by an arson attack in 1978. In 1987 restoration work costing £1.5 million was started by the Leadmill Association arts charity and backed by the Allen Tod group of architects alongside Henry Boot as the main contractor with funding coming from Sheffield City Council, European Regional Development Fund (ERDF), English Tourist Board, English Heritage and the Arts Council. This partial renovation included a cutlery shop, visitor centre and a pub, The Rattener's Rest on the ground floor. The Leadmill Association ran into financial difficulties and went into insolvency in 1994 and Velocity Estates bought the works in the mid 1990s, and undertook a complete refurbishment lasting 18 months and costing several million pounds. The work retained as much of the original fabric of the building as was possible after the fire and created a building with a floor space of approximately 30,000 square feet. Now known as the Globe Business Centre, it is home to around 22 companies with the office space being managed by Davison Property Management, providing various sized offices suitable for micro, small and medium-sized businesses.
