= High Hazels Park =

Park in South Yorkshire, England

Coordinates: 53.385504°N 1.398418°W

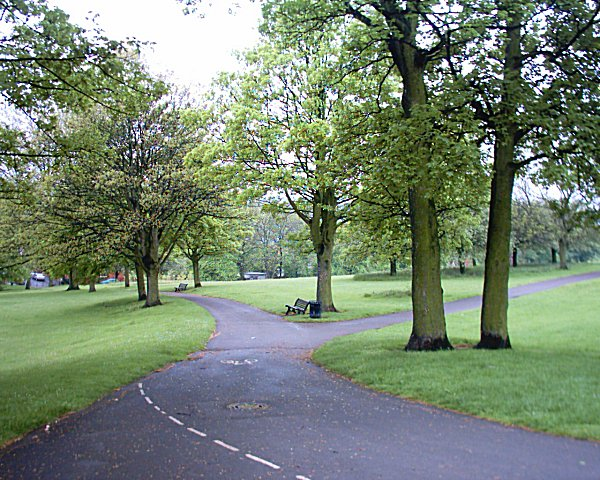
High Hazels Park

High Hazels Park is a 20-hectare parkland area in Darnall, Sheffield, South Yorkshire, England. Since the 19th century, Darnall has been a centre of the coal and steel industry in Sheffield. High Hazels House, located in the park, was built in 1850 by William Jeffcock (the first Mayor of Sheffield). In 1894, Sheffield City Council (the Corporation of Sheffield) bought the land and house from the Duke of Norfolk and Messers Jeffcock for £10,875. In 1895, the land was first used as a public recreation ground and was classed as one of the finest parks within the city of Sheffield. The park used to be home to a boating lake, which has since been filled in.

== High Hazels House ==
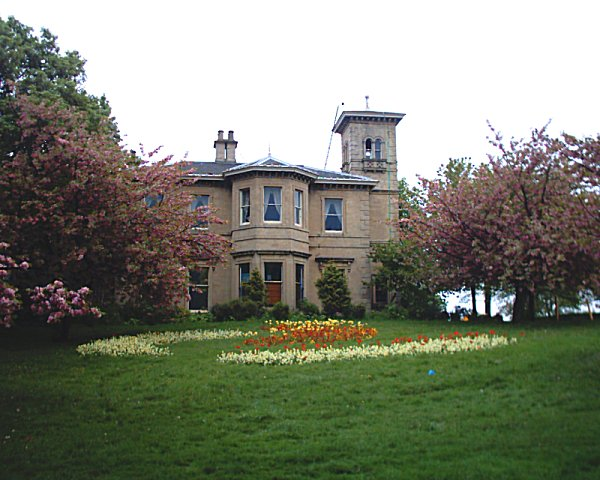
High Hazels House

High Hazels House was commissioned by William Jeffcock, and was built regardless of cost. The building included a number of outbuildings and stabling for twelve horses. The arches that lead to the main entrance were built of the same stone as the Houses of Parliament. Following the death of Jeffcock Jr. in 1863, the house was rented out and at one point used as a boys boarding school to avoid the house falling into ruin. Following the purchase of the estate by the city council in 1894 the gardens were landscaped, possibly by Robert Marnock, to become a public park. In 1901, High Hazels House became a museum which housed a collection with many rare pieces relating to Sheffield history and which, in its heyday attracted over 60,000 visitors a year.

During World War II, the house was used as a base for the Home Guard with many local residents being recruited. The museum closed shortly after the war, and became the clubhouse for Tinsley Park golf course.

== Garden ==
The formal garden was officially opened on 16 March 2005 by Councillor Gill Furniss and John Jeffcock, the 4th great-grandson of William Jeffcock who built High Hazels House.

The design for the formal garden was developed by the University of Sheffield following community consultation. Work on the garden included opening up the woodland area, new planting and restoration of seating. Local artist Hilary Cartmel designed the entrance to the garden, which includes welcome in various languages.

== The Sensory Garden ==
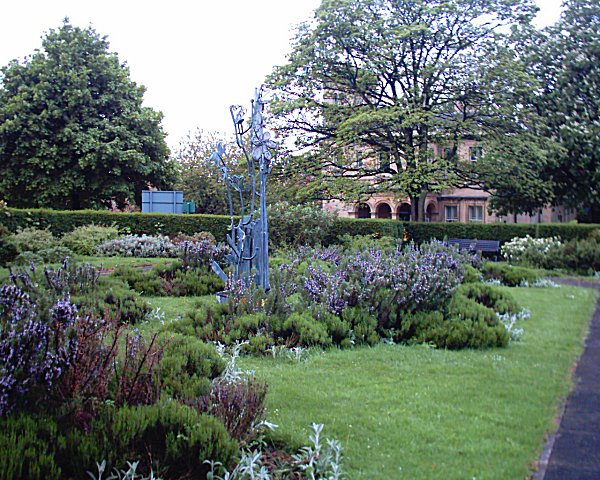
The sensory garden

A sensory garden designed to stimulate the five senses has been planted near the house. The garden was once a rose garden, but was transformed to a sensory garden before opening on 6 June 2004.
