= William Clegg (footballer) =

English footballer and politician (1852–1932)

- Born: 21 April 1852; Sheffield, Yorkshire, England
- Died: 22 August 1932 (aged 80); Sheffield, Yorkshire, England
- Occupations: Footballer, solicitor and politician

Sir William Edwin Clegg CBE JP (21 April 1852 – 22 August 1932) was an English footballer and politician.

== Football career ==
Born in Sheffield, he was the younger brother of Charles Clegg with whom he played at Sheffield Wednesday. The two were the first brothers to both be capped for England, although they never played in the same match. He was described as being "a safe kick and good half-back" in Charles Alcock's 1875 edition of the Football Annual.

After retiring from football through injury, he continued within the game as an administrator and became president of Sheffield Wednesday and vice president of Sheffield and Hallamshire Football Association.

Clegg became a solicitor. His most notable case was when he represented the notorious criminal Charles Peace.

== Political career ==
He also went on to have a successful political career and was Lord Mayor of Sheffield in 1898. He became known as 'the uncrowned king of Sheffield'. Clegg was knighted in 1906.

Clegg was the leader of the Liberal group on Sheffield City Council from 1895. In his early years, he campaigned for the municipalisation of the tramways in the city, and then for the construction of council housing in the city. He was able to ensure that an estate was built at Wincobank, and a project to build 400 houses was begun in 1909. He also acted as the major financier of the local Liberal group.

Clegg was considered to be on the right of the Liberal Party and was associated with the Liberal League. He was opposed to socialism and was hostile to the Labour Party. From 1909, he began co-operating closely with the Conservative Party group on the council, and in 1920 the two parties formed the Citizens' Association, Clegg being its first leader. He pursued low-tax policies at the expense of cutting services and running up debts. He was an opponent of David Lloyd George's policies. The Association lost control of the council to Labour in 1926, who removed him from the aldermanic bench.

Following his deposition from the council, Clegg concentrated on social and philanthropic work and in particular he took an interest in education. He became the pro-chancellor of the University of Sheffield and chairman of the Sheffield education committee.

Clegg had married twice and had a son and daughter. Clegg died in a Sheffield nursing home 22 August 1932 aged 80.

== See also ==
- The trial of Charlie Peace, the Banner Cross murderer

Political offices
Preceded by ?	Leader of Sheffield City Council; 1901 – 1903	Succeeded by Herbert Hughes
Preceded by Herbert Hughes	Leader of Sheffield City Council; 1905 – 1907	Succeeded by Herbert Hughes
Preceded by Herbert Hughes	Leader of Sheffield City Council; 1911 – 1926	Succeeded by Ernest Rowlinson
