= List of mayors of Sheffield =

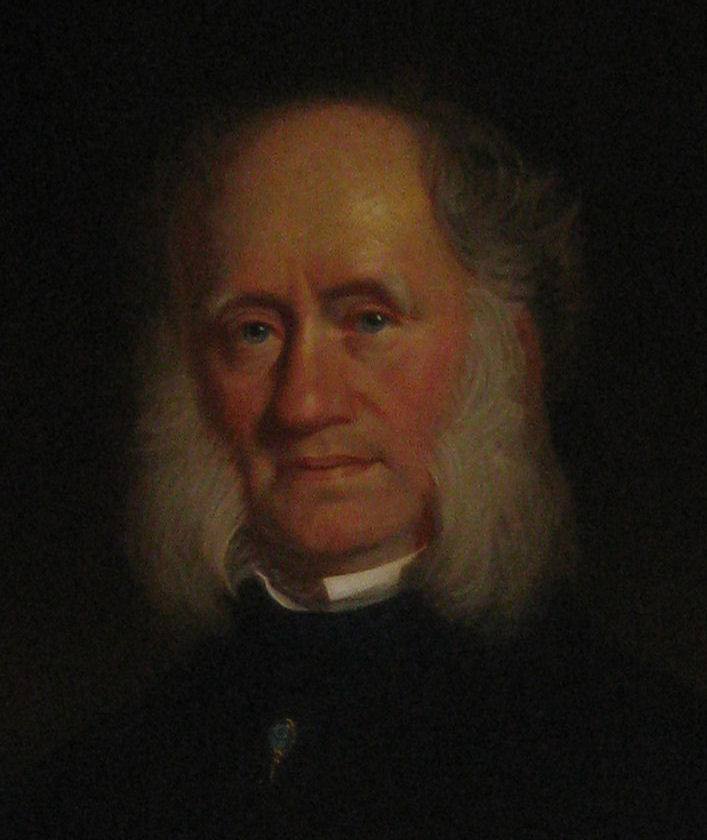
William Jeffcock, first Mayor of Sheffield, portrait in Sheffield Town Hall

The Lord Mayor of Sheffield is a ceremonial post held by a member of Sheffield City Council. They are elected annually by the council. The post originated in 1843, with the appointment of William Jeffcock as the first Mayor of Sheffield. Early mayors had significant powers and chaired both council meetings and the bench of magistrates.

In 1855, the mayor was refused a good seat at the opening of the Paris Exhibition, as he did not have a chain of office. As a result, one was purchased the following year, and this has remained in use.

In 1897, in the same year as the opening of Sheffield Town Hall, the mayor was given the right to style himself the "Lord Mayor". To mark this, the first Lord Mayor, Henry Fitzalan-Howard, 15th Duke of Norfolk, gave the Sheffield Mace to the city to mark the royal authority invested in the post.

The Lord Mayor has the use of the Lord Mayor's Parlour in Sheffield Town Hall, has an official badge, and holds the honorary presidency of several organisations. The Lord Mayor's Awards and the Lord Mayor's Charity Fund are local institutions organised in the name of the Lord Mayor.

Ann Eliza Longden was the first female Lord Mayor (1936–7).

Notable former mayors include George Bassett, founder of a confectionery firm, and the steelmaker Mark Firth.

== List of mayors of Sheffield ==
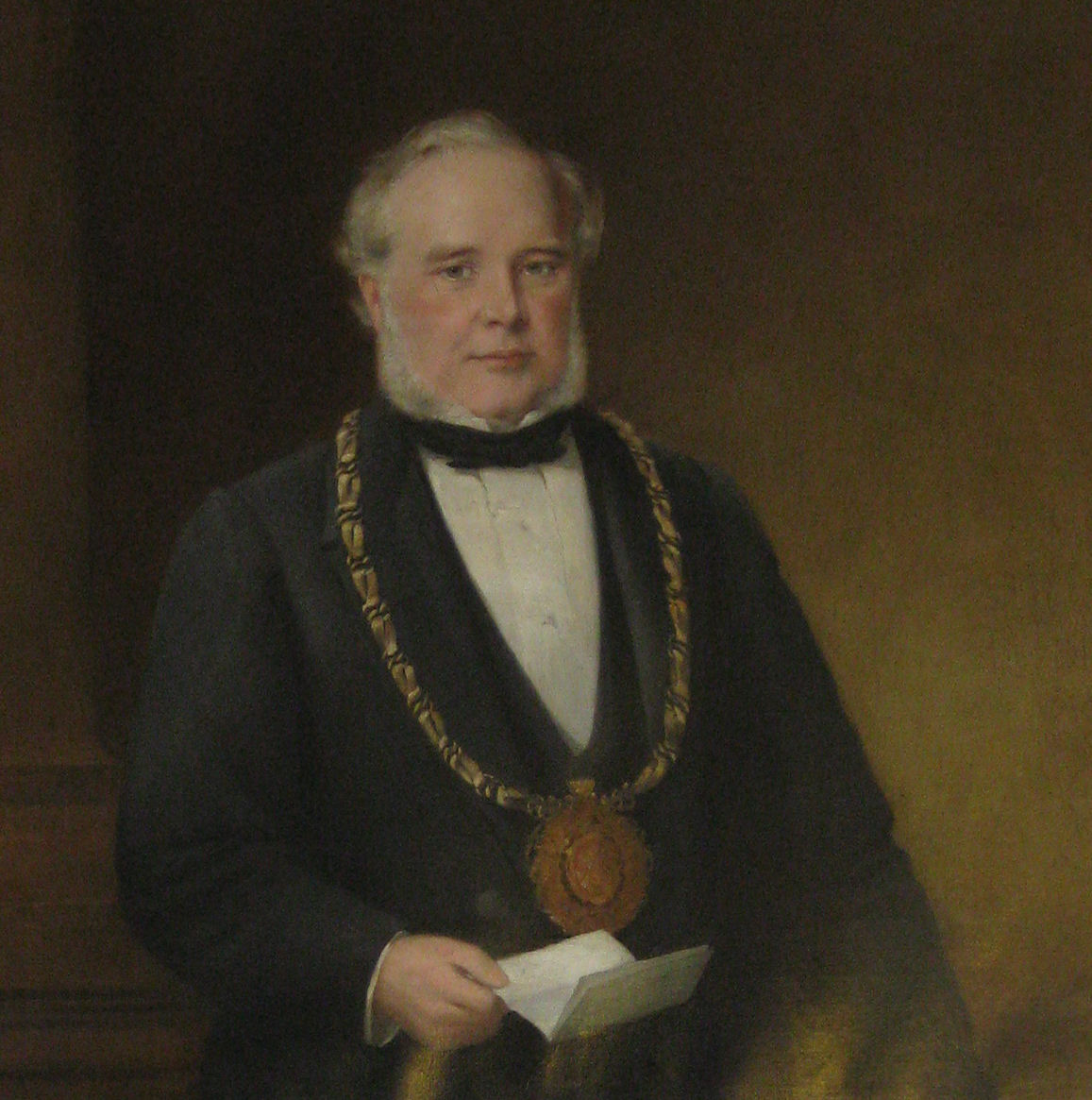
Sir John Brown with the Chain of office, portrait in Sheffield Town Hall

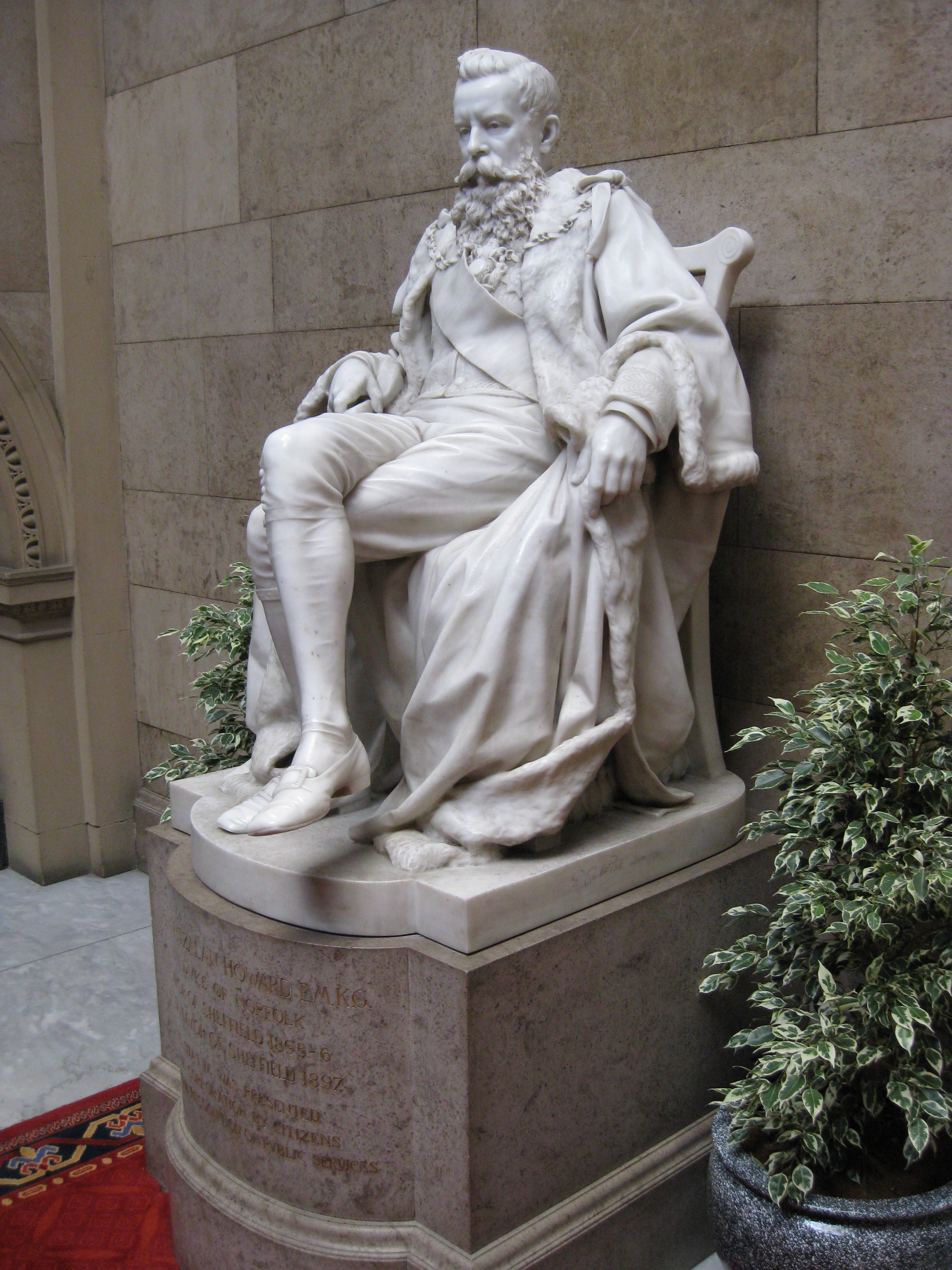
Statue of Henry Fitzalan Howard, the last Mayor and first Lord Mayor of Sheffield, in the lobby of Sheffield Town Hall

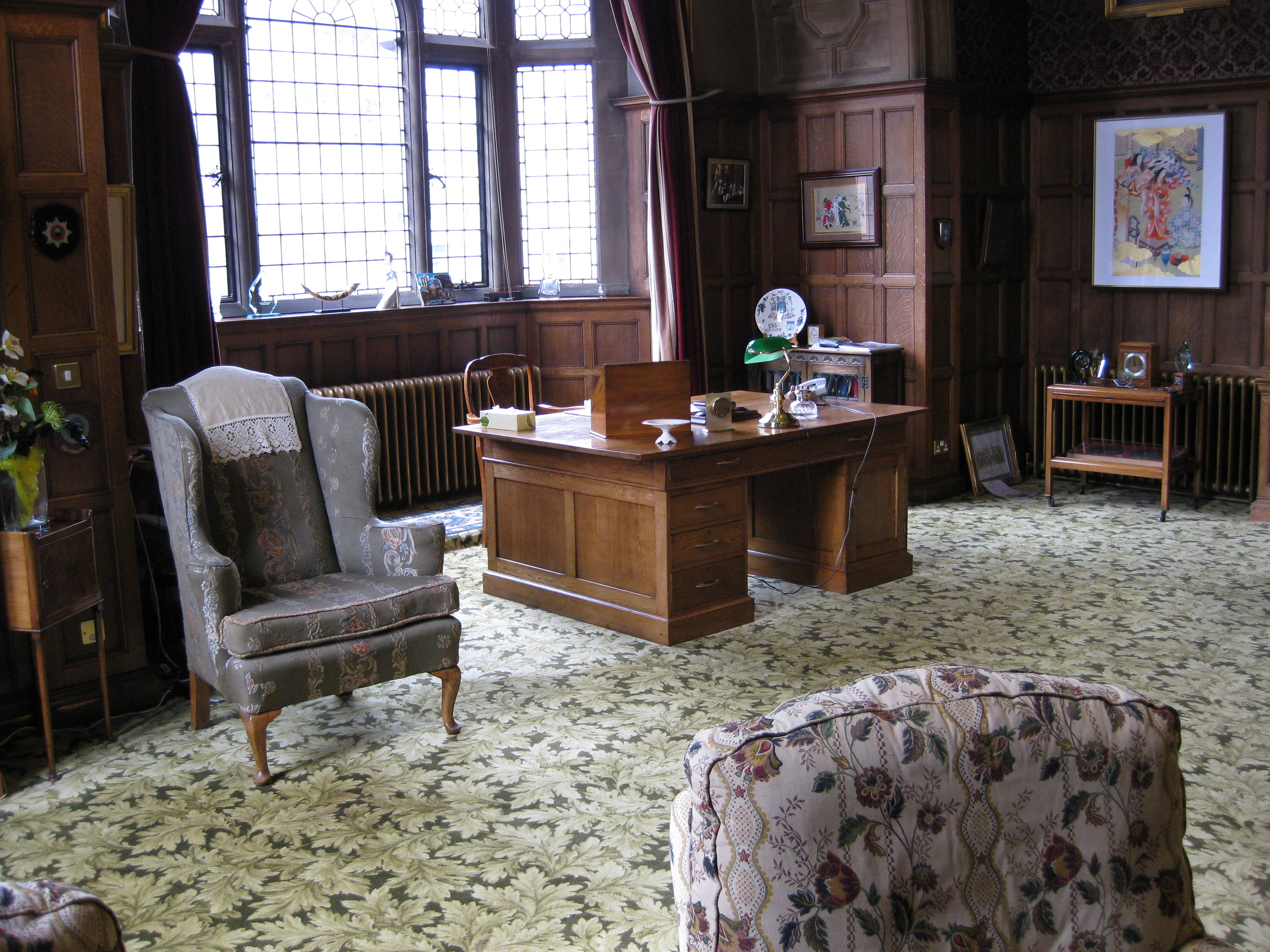
The Lord Mayor's Parlour

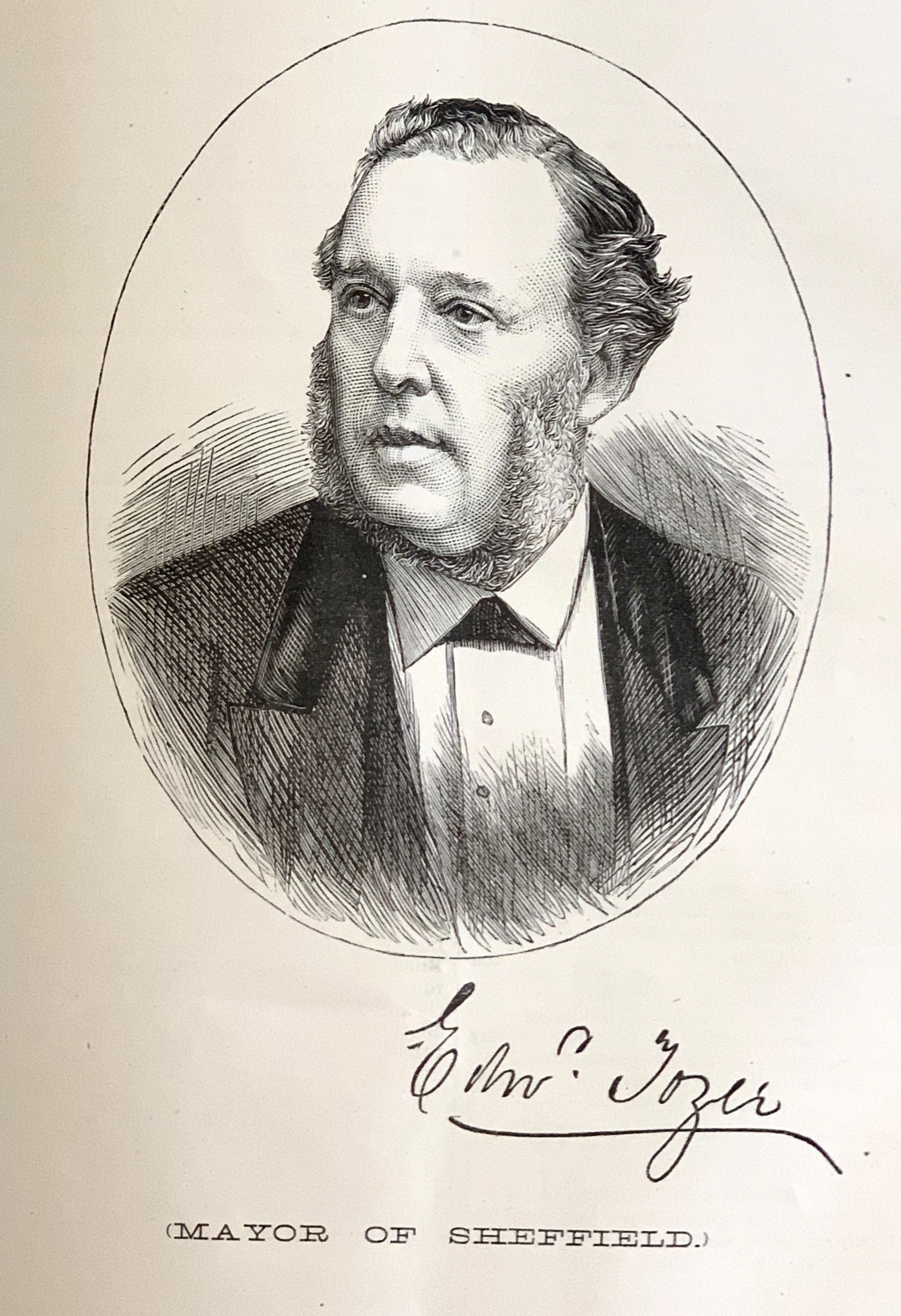
Edward Tozer Mayor of Sheffield 1879

Year	Name	Party
1843	William Jeffcock	-
1844	Thomas Dunn	Whig
1845	Samuel Butcher	-
1846	Henry Wilkinson	-
1847	Edward Vickers	-
1848	T. R. Barker	-
1849	Thomas Birks	-
1850	Thomas Burdett Turton	-
1851	John Carr	-
1852	W. A. Matthews	-
1853	Francis Hoole	-
1854	William Fisher	-
1855	William Fawcett	-
1856	John William Pye-Smith	Liberal
1857	R. Jackson	-
1858	Charles Atkinson	-
1859	Henry E. Hoole	-
1860	Henry Vickers	-
1861–62	Sir John Brown	Conservative
1863–64	Thomas Jessop	-
1865	W. E. Laycock	-
1866–67	John Webster	Conservative
1868–71	Thomas Moore	Conservative
1872	John Fairburn	-
1873	Joseph Hallam	-
1874	Mark Firth	Liberal
1875	John Tasker	-
1876	George Bassett	Conservative
1877	Sir Frederick Mappin	Liberal
1878	David Ward	-
1879	Edward Tozer	-
1880	Abram Brooksbank	-
1881–82	Michael Hunter, Jnr.	-
1883–84	William Henry Brittain	-
1885	John W. Pye Smith	Liberal
1886	Sir Henry Stephenson	Liberal Unionist
1887–88	William Johnson Clegg	Liberal
1889	J. B. Jackson	-
1890	Samuel Osborn (Note: Elected in place of the late Mayor.)	-
1891	William Johnson Clegg	Liberal
1891	Joseph Gamble	-
1892	J. Batty Langley	Liberal
1893	E. S. Foster	Liberal
1894	Sir Charles. T. Skelton	Liberal
1895–96	Henry Fitzalan-Howard	-

== List of lord mayors of Sheffield ==
Year	Name	Party
1897	Henry Fitzalan-Howard (Note: Lord Mayor from July to November 1897)	Conservative
1897	George Franklin	-
1898	William Edwin Clegg	Liberal
1899	Samuel Roberts	Conservative
1900	John Eaton	-
1901	George Senior	Conservative
1902	John Wycliffe Wilson	Liberal
1903	John Rutland Wheatley	-
1904	Joseph Jonas	-
1905	Herbert Hughes	-
1906	Robert Styring	Liberal
1907	Harry P. Marsh	-
1908	Henry Kenyon Stephenson	Liberal
1909	Earl Fitzwilliam	Conservative
1910	Henry Kenyon Stephenson	Liberal
1911	Albert John Hobson	-
1912	Samuel Osborn	Liberal
1913	George Ernest Branson	-
1914	Oliver Charles Wilson	Liberal
1915	Frederick Arthur Warlow	Liberal
1916	Walter Appleyard	Liberal
1917	Alfred Cattell	Conservative
1918	William Irons	Liberal
1919	Samuel Roberts	Conservative
1920	William Farewell Wardle	Citizen's
1921	Charles Simpson	Citizen's
1922	William Carter Fenton	Citizen's
1923	Arthur James Blanchard	Citizen's
1924	Alfred James Bailey	Citizen's
1925	Joseph Benson	Citizen's
1926	John George Graves	Citizen's
1927	Moses Humberstone	Labour
1928	Harry Bolton	-
1929	Charles William Beardsley	Labour
1930	Harold Warters Jackson	Municipal Progressive
1931	Thomas Henry Watkins	-
1932	Ernest Wilson	-
1933	Fred Marshall	Labour
1934	Percival J. M. Turner	-
1935	Frank Thraves	Labour
1936	Ann Eliza Longden	Conservative
1937	Ernest George Rowlinson	Labour
1938	William Joseph Hunter	-
1939	John Arthur Longden	-
1940	Luther Frederick Milner	-
1941	Charles Josiah Mitchell	Labour
1942	Harry England Bridgwater	-
1943	Samuel Hartley Marshall	Labour
1944	George Ernest Marlow	-
1945	Charles William Gascoigne	Labour
1946	Ernest Storm Graham	-
1947	William Ernest Yorke (Note: November 1947 to May 1949 due to change in election dates)	Labour
1949	Grace Tebbutt	Labour
1950	Herbert Keeble Hawson	-
1951	Thomas William Bridgland	Labour
1952	Peter Buchanan	Labour
1953	Oliver Spencer Holmes	-
1954	John Henry Bingham	Labour
1955	Joseph Curtis	Labour
1956	Robert Neill	National Liberal
1957	Albert Ballard	Labour Co-op
1958	John William Holland	Labour
1959	Alfred Vernon Wolstenholme	-
1960	Harold Slack	Labour
1961	James Wilfred Sterland	Labour
1962	Percival Cyril John Taylor Kirkman	-
1963	Isidore Lewis	Labour
1964	Albert Smith	Labour
1965	John Stenton Worrall	Labour
1966	Lionel Stephen Edward Farris	Conservative
1967	Harold Lambert	Labour
1968	Patience Sheard	Labour
1969	Daniel Joseph O'Neill	Conservative
1970	John Basil Peile (Note: Elected in place of the late Lord Mayor)	Conservative
1970	Sidney Irwin Dyson	Labour
1971	Harold Hebblethwaite	Conservative
1972	Martha Strafford	Labour
1973	Stanley Kenneth Arnold	Conservative
1974	Leonard Cope	Labour
1975	Albert Edward Richardson	Labour
1976	Reginald Edward Munn	Labour
1977	Winifred Mary Golding	Labour
1978	Peter Harold Jackson	Conservative
1979	George Armitage	Labour
1980	William Owen	Labour
1981	Enid Anne Hattersley	Labour
1982	Gordon Wragg	Conservative
1983	Peter Morgan Newton Jones	Labour
1984	George Roy Munn	Labour
1985	Dorothy Walton	Labour
1986	Frank Prince	Labour
1987	Peter Horton	Labour
1988	Phyllis May Smith	Labour
1989	Anthony Damms	Labour
1990	James Moore	Labour
1991	Doris Askham	Labour
1992	William Jordan	Labour
1993	Qurban Hussain	Labour
1994	Ian Saunders	Labour
1995	David Heslop	Conservative
1996	Peter Price	Labour
1997	Antony Arber	Labour
1998	Frank White	Labour
1999	Trevor Bagshaw	Liberal Democrats
2000	Patricia Midgley	Labour
2001	David Baker	Liberal Democrats
2002	Marjorie Barker	Labour
2003	Diane Leek (Note: May 2003 to June 2004 due to change in election date)	Liberal Democrats
2004	Mike Pye	Labour
2005	Roger Davison	Liberal Democrats
2006	Jackie Drayton	Labour
2007	Arthur Dunworth	Liberal Democrats
2008	Jane Bird	Labour
2009	Graham Oxley	Liberal Democrats
2010	Alan Law	Labour
2011	Sylvia Dunkley	Liberal Democrats
2012	John Campbell	Labour
2013	Vickie Priestley	Liberal Democrats
2014	Peter Rippon	Labour
2015	Talib Hussain	Labour
2016	Denise Fox	Labour
2017	Anne Murphy	Labour
2018	Magid Magid	Green
2019	Tony Downing	Labour
2020	Tony Downing (Note: Second term due to COVID-19 pandemic in the United Kingdom)	Labour
2021	Gail Smith	Liberal Democrats
2022	Sioned-Mair Richards	Labour
2023	Colin Ross	Liberal Democrats
2024	Jayne Dunn	Labour
2025	Safiya Saeed	Labour
2026	Andrew Sangar	Liberal Democrats
