= Edward Vickers =

British businessman (1804–1897)

Edward Vickers (1804–1897) was the founder of Naylor Vickers & Co. which became Vickers Limited. He was the brother of Henry Vickers.

== Career ==
Vickers was a successful miller who invested his money in the railway industry. In 1828 he garnered control of his father-in-law's steel foundry business, formerly Naylor & Sanderson, and renamed it Naylor Vickers & Co. He went on to be Alderman and the Mayor of Sheffield and was the first President of the Sheffield Chamber of Commerce.

== Family ==
In 1828 Vickers married Anne Naylor. They had seven children (George Naylor (1830–1889) who married Maria Jackson, granddaughter of steelmaker James Jackson, Thomas Edward (1833–1915), Sarah Ann (1836–1919), Albert (1838–1919), Frederick (1840–?), Gertrude L. (1845–?) and Isabel (1847–?)).

== Sources ==
- Zander, Patrick Glenn (2011). Right Modern Technology, Nation, and Britain's Extreme Right in the Interwar Period. ISBN 978-1243624611.
