= Sir Alexander Wilson, 1st Baronet =

Sir Alexander Wilson, 1st Baronet (1837–1907) was a Scottish steel company executive, known for his role in developing compound armour for warships.

== Life ==
He was born at Haughmill near Windygates in Fifeshire, the son of George Wilson of Prinlaws on the River Leven and his wife Isabella Ralph; his elder brother George Wilson (1829–1885) joined in 1846 Cammell & Co., steelmakers in the Don valley near Sheffield, and in 1864 became its managing director, with Charles Cammell as chairman.

Their father was a manufacturer in the flax trade at Broughty Ferry. After he and Cammell in met in 1838, when Cammell was on holiday, George Wilson the younger was sent to the Sheffield Collegiate School, aged around nine. He joined the Johnson Cammell firm in his early twenties, and went on to marry one of Cammell's daughters. After education at Madras College in St Andrews and Edinburgh University, Alexander Wilson also joined the firm in the 1850s.

The naval officer and inventor Jasper Henry Selwyn was an advocate for naval armour in the 1860s, and in 1870 called attention to anvil composition—i.e. wrought iron faced with steel—for its construction. At the Dronfield site of the Cammell group in Derbyshire, production of steel-faced compound armour plate began, under a patent taken out by Alexander Wilson. The plate was accepted by the British government by 1880, as was a rival product from the Atlas Works of John Brown & Company, using a patent of J. D. Ellis. "In Cammell plates, which were made by the Wilson process, the steel face was formed by running molten steel on to a white-hot foundation plate of iron", while in the other technique "a thin steel surface plate was cemented on to the wrought-iron foundation by running in molten steel between".

When Charles Cammell & Co. and Laird Brothers amalgamated in 1903, Wilson was chairman of the former. At that time he stated that Cammell & Co., in the armour plate business, did well to join a shipbuilder.

== Baronetcy ==
Escutcheon of the Wilson baronets of Archer House

The Wilson baronetcy, of Archer House in the County of York, was created in the Baronetage of the United Kingdom on 26 August 1897 for Alexander Wilson. He had married in 1866 Edith Hester Vickers, second daughter of Henry Vickers, but left no issue, and the title became extinct on his death in 1907.

== Notes ==
Baronetage of the United Kingdom
Preceded by Wills baronets	Wilson baronets of Archer House; 26 August 1897	Succeeded by Faudel-Phillips baronets
