= Henry Vickers =

British solicitor and politician (1807–1882)

Henry Vickers (1807–1882) was a British solicitor and mayor of Sheffield. He was the brother of Edward Vickers.

== Career ==
Vickers was born in 1807 and was responsible for the construction of Holmwood House on Ecclesall Road, which became his residence.

His daughter Edith Hester married Sir Alexander Wilson, 1st Baronet (1837–1907).
