= Ernest Rowlinson =

Ernest George Rowlinson (15 March 1882 – 4 January 1941) was a British Labour Party politician.

Born in Great Shelford in Cambridgeshire, Rowlinson moved to Chesterfield around 1895 to work on the railways. He joined the Independent Labour Party (ILP) and the Amalgamated Society of Railway Servants (ASRS); he subsequently moved to Sheffield and led the ASRS branch at Sheffield railway station, where he was prominent in the railway strike of 1911.

Rowlinson was sacked after the strike of 1911 and instead worked for the Co-operative Insurance Society, although he remained a member of the ASRS, who elected him as their delegate to Sheffield Trades and Labour Council. He was elected as president of the council in 1913, and worked in particular to promote Labour Party candidates in the city. During World War I, he fought overseas with the British Army.

In 1921, Rowlinson was elected to Sheffield City Council, representing Crookesmoor, becoming the leader of the Labour group the following year. In 1926, Labour became the largest group on the council, and Rowlinson became the first Labour Party council leader in a major British city. He resigned his position on the trades council to focus on the city council, and he led a successful regime, widely imitated across the country. In particular, it greatly expanded education provision in the city, and built the new Sheffield Central Library. In 1937/38, he also served as Lord Mayor of Sheffield.

Political offices
Preceded by William Clegg	Leader of Sheffield City Council; 1926–1932	Succeeded by Arthur Blanchard
Preceded by Arthur Blanchard	Leader of Sheffield City Council; 1933–1941	Succeeded by William Asbury
Civic offices
Preceded by Ann Eliza Longden	Lord Mayor of Sheffield; 1937–1938	Succeeded by William Joseph Hunter
