= Charles Cammell =

Charles Cammell (1810–1879) was a British salesman and entrepreneur in the steel industry, active in the Sheffield area. His name survives in the Cammell Laird heavy engineering company, formed several decades after his death.

== Early life and background ==
He was the fourth and youngest son of George Cammell of Kingston upon Hull, a shipmaster, and his wife Hannah Wilson (died 1825). His elder brother George Cammell junior, who died in 1857 at age 58, was shipping agent for the Hull agent for the "Dundee and Hull Steam Packet": the Forfarshire, the paddle steamer wrecked off the Farne Islands on 7 September 1838. In 1863 the partnership trading as George Cammell, Shipping and Commission agents was re-formed, trading subsequently as Cammell, Woolf & Haigh, shipowners at Hull.

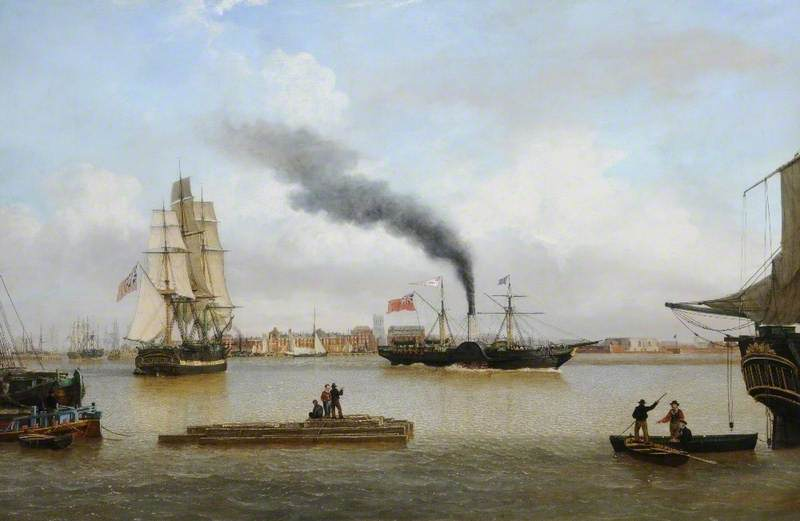
PS 'Forfarshire' Leaving Hull for Dundee by John Ward, a picture thought likely a commission from George Cammell junior, shipping agent for the vessel, and to have been in his estate on death.

Born in Hull, Charles Cammell served an apprenticeship there with an ironmonger. It was completed in 1830, and he moved to Sheffield.

== Ibbotson Brothers ==
Cammell went to work in Sheffield at the Globe Steel Works of the Ibbotson Brothers, a purpose-built cutlery factory constructed from 1825 to 1830. By 1832 he was a commercial traveller for the company, in cutlery and files. At the time the Sheffield steel products industry was fragmented, largely dependent on artisanal batch production. The American market was of great importance, and bar iron was imported from Sweden from which steel was produced.

== Johnson, Cammell & Co. ==
At the time of the American panic of 1837, Cammell set up his own business on Furnival Street, Sheffield, with Thomas Johnson from Ibbotsons and his brother Henry Johnson. They made files and other steel tools. The company sold products for the railway boom, and opened the Cyclops Works on Savile Street in 1845.

On a sporting holiday in 1838 in the East of Scotland, Cammell met two of the sons of George Wilson, an flax industrialist at Broughty Ferry. As a result, George Wilson the younger was sent to the Sheffield Collegiate School, aged around nine. He joined the Johnson Cammell firm in his early twenties, and successfully carried out a trip to the American market. The younger brother Alexander Wilson also joined the firm, in the 1850s. Both had Scottish university degrees. George Wilson had then been works manager for some years, Cammell's role being in sales.

== Charles Cammell & Co. ==
The renaming of the company in 1855 reflected the death of Thomas Johnson in 1852, and the retirement that year of his replacement as partner Edward Bury. It was growing, and making Bessemer process steel. It became a limited company in 1864, Cammell becoming chairman, his interest having been bought out for £200,000, and George Wilson the managing director, until 1885.

== Property owner ==
Cammell bought Norton Hall outside Sheffield in 1851. He also acquired an estate at Hathersage in Derbyshire, and Ditcham Park, Buriton, Hampshire.

== Family ==
Cammell married in 1845 Marianne Wright, widow of John Wright (1808–1844) of Birmingham; she was born Mary Ann Rollason, daughter of Thomas Rollason. A report of her first marriage in 1835 described her as "Mary Anne, third daughter of Thomas Rollason, Gent. of Sheldon." He is also described as being of Erdington.

The couple had six sons and a daughter Alice Maud, who married in 1872 Edward Martin (1846–1928), called to the bar in 1871. He was the son of Edward Martin of Rempstone and his wife Mary Addey, daughter of George Addey of Upperthorpe, Sheffield. The sons were:

- Charles David Wilson Cammell of Norton Hall, Ditcham Park and Huttons Ambo (1847–1905). He was twice married, firstly in 1873 to Florence Annie Elwon, daughter of the ironmaster Thomas Light Elwon. They had three daughters; the marriage ended in divorce, and Florence married secondly, in 1883, Arthur Clarke-Jervoise, later of the Clarke-Jervoise baronets. Secondly, in 1884, Cammell married Geraldine Theresa Haworth-Booth, second daughter of Benjamin Blaydes Haworth-Booth.
- Bernard Edward Cammell (1850–1832) took part in the Wilson & Cammell ironworks at Dronfield, with George Wilson, as a venture separate from Cammell & Co. He is known as an artist, under the name Bernard E. Cammell. He married Evelyn Jane Wellesley, daughter of William Henry Charles Wellesley, and granddaughter of Gerald Valerian Wellesley.
- George Henry Cammell (1851–1903). He married in 1881 Edith Mildred Cordelia Haworth-Booth, eldest daughter of Benjamin Blaydes Haworth-Booth. His daughter Edith Violet was the mother of Godfrey Meynell VC.
- Otto Charles Arthur Cammell, died in Mexico 1892.
- Minard Augustus Cammell, died 1898.
- Archibald Allan Cammell (1856–1911) resigned in 1880 as a lieutenant from the 14th Hussars, and that year married Katherine Marion Orr, daughter of John Henry Orr, army surgeon in India. He died aged 54 and left three children. The sons were Reginald Archibald Cammell and Gerald Arthur Cammell (1889–1933). Daughter Constance Maude Cammell married in 1914, at St. Stephen's Church, Ootacamund in India, William Henry Beach and was mother of Hugh Beach.
