= Grace Tebbutt =

British local politician

Dame Grace Tebbutt DBE (née Mellor; 5 January 1893 – 1983) was a British local politician and a key figure in Sheffield politics in the mid-20th century. She was affiliated to the Labour Party, serving as the first female leader of Sheffield City Council, Sheffield's first female Alderman and the first female Labour Lord Mayor in 1949.

== Early life ==
Tebbutt was born on 5 January 1893. Her grandfather was the renowned Attercliffe Liberal worker and trade unionist, William Mellar.

In 1913, she married Frank Tebbutt in Sheffield. A year later Grace gave birth to their daughter Irene.

Frank became the secretary of the Attercliffe Divisional Labour Party, a position he held for seven years. During this time Grace occupied all the chief offices in the women’s section of the Divisional Party. She was also the president of the Tinsley Women’s section and was vice-president of the divisional party. They were involved in the Clarion Club in Sheffield where they spent much of their time volunteering.

== Political career ==
Tebbutt ran unsuccessfully for public office twice - contesting the Broomhall Ward in 1927 and Burngreave Ward in the last guardians' election. She was finally elected as councilor to the Sheffield City Council for Tinsley Ward in November 1929, for a period of two years. She retained her seat at a further Municipal Election in 1931. It seems likely that Tebbutt was elected to the position of Sheffield’s first female Alderman in April 1934. As Grace and Frank lived at the Clarion Club House at Dore Moor, after Frank’s appointment as steward the previous year, she was able to meet the residence qualifications required to take the new aldermanic seat that had become available after the inclusion of the Norton Ward onto the council. From 1937, she served as the Chair of the Parks Committee.

In 1949, Tebbutt became the first female Lord Mayor of Sheffield for the Labour Party, preceded only by Ann E. Longdon in 1936. During her time as Mayor, in addition to her many other ceremonial duties, she attended her first professional football on Saturday the 7th of January, 1950, watching Sheffield United play Leicester City in the FA Cup at Bramall Lane.

Tebbutt became the first female leader of Sheffield City Council in 1960, a role she held until 1966. In 1966, Tebbutt was involved in the backing the Sheffield Theatre Trust’s plans to build, what would become, the Sheffield Crucible. In 1966, Tebbutt helped oversee Sheffield’s arrangements for the 1966 World Cup.

== Character ==
Colin George gives a wry account of Tebbutt as he recounts his development of the Crucible theatre. He described her as a “formidable northern lady”, who made his carefully worded speech arguing for a Council subsidy redundant when she, "sitting on her mayoral throne and greeting us like a headmistress with naughty children", replied with her thunderbolt: "Nah then, where do you want your new theatre?"

Similarly when Roy Hattersley, in his memoir A Yorkshire Boyhood, recalls the elated moment of his election he takes a moment to pay homage to Grace Tebbutt, who he calls "Mrs Beddows of South Riding made flesh", as she announced his win.

== Honours and death ==
Tebbutt was conferred the title of Honorary Freeman of the City of Sheffield on 2 September 1959. She received an honorary degree from the University of Sheffield on the 17th of July 1965.

Tebbutt was honoured in the 1960 Birthday Honours, receiving a CBE “for public services in Sheffield”, and again in 1966 for "political and public services in Sheffield." thus becoming a Dame Commander of the Order of the British Empire.

Tebbutt likely died in Sheffield, at the age of 90, between April and June of 1983.

Grace Tebbutt House was a refuge for homeless women in Sheffield that was featured in a 2011 episode of The Secret Millionaire.
