= William Jeffcock =

British mayor

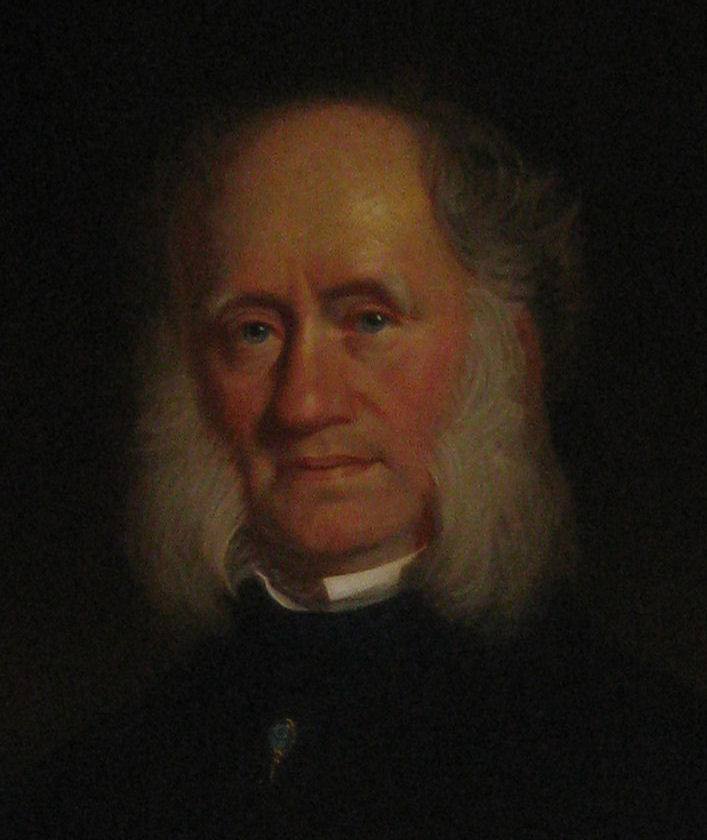
William Jeffcock: Portrait in Sheffield Town Hall

William Jeffcock, JP (1800–1871) a coal-master of Jeffcock, Dunn & Co., later known as the Sheffield Coal Company, Ltd. became the first Mayor of Sheffield in 1843.

== Biography ==
Jeffcock was born in April 1800 in Handsworth, South Yorkshire, the son of John Jeffcock, a colliery owner (1763–1814) and Elizabeth Dunn. On 2 January 1827 he married Judith Stobart. They had two sons William Henry (1831–1863) and Charles Edward (1834–1857) and two daughters, Catherine Elizabeth (1827–1844) and Mary Stobart (1828–1903).

A public meeting was held in Sheffield on 3 January 1838, which sent a petition to the Queen for incorporation; but it was not till 1840 when the Justices of the West Riding at Wakefield, resolved to apply the provisions of the County Police Act 1839 to the populous parts of the West Riding – thus placing the large unincorporated towns in the hands of the County Magistracy – that headway was made. The Charter was granted on 31 August 1843 – the day it received the Royal Assent. On 9 November following the first meeting of the Town Council was held in one of the rooms of the late Banking House of Messrs. Parker, Shore and Co., under the presidency of W. Smith, at which William Jeffcock was chosen Mayor of Sheffield. His first cousin, Thomas Dunn, succeeded him as second mayor in 1844.

In 1846 he was made a Justice of the Peace. On 14 August 1833 he was made a captain in the South West Yorkshire Yeomanry Cavalry which in 1844 become the First West Yorkshire Yeomanry Cavalry. Thirty two years later on 14 April 1865 he was made a Major in the 1st West York, under the command of William Wentworth-Fitzwilliam, 6th Earl Fitzwilliam K.G. who was the colonel for some 40 years, until 1886.

In 1850, on the family estate, he commissioned a mansion house High Hazels to be built "regardless of cost". The house is now used as the club house for Tinsley Park Golf Club. The stained glass window installed 1850 to commemorate the construction of the house is still there.

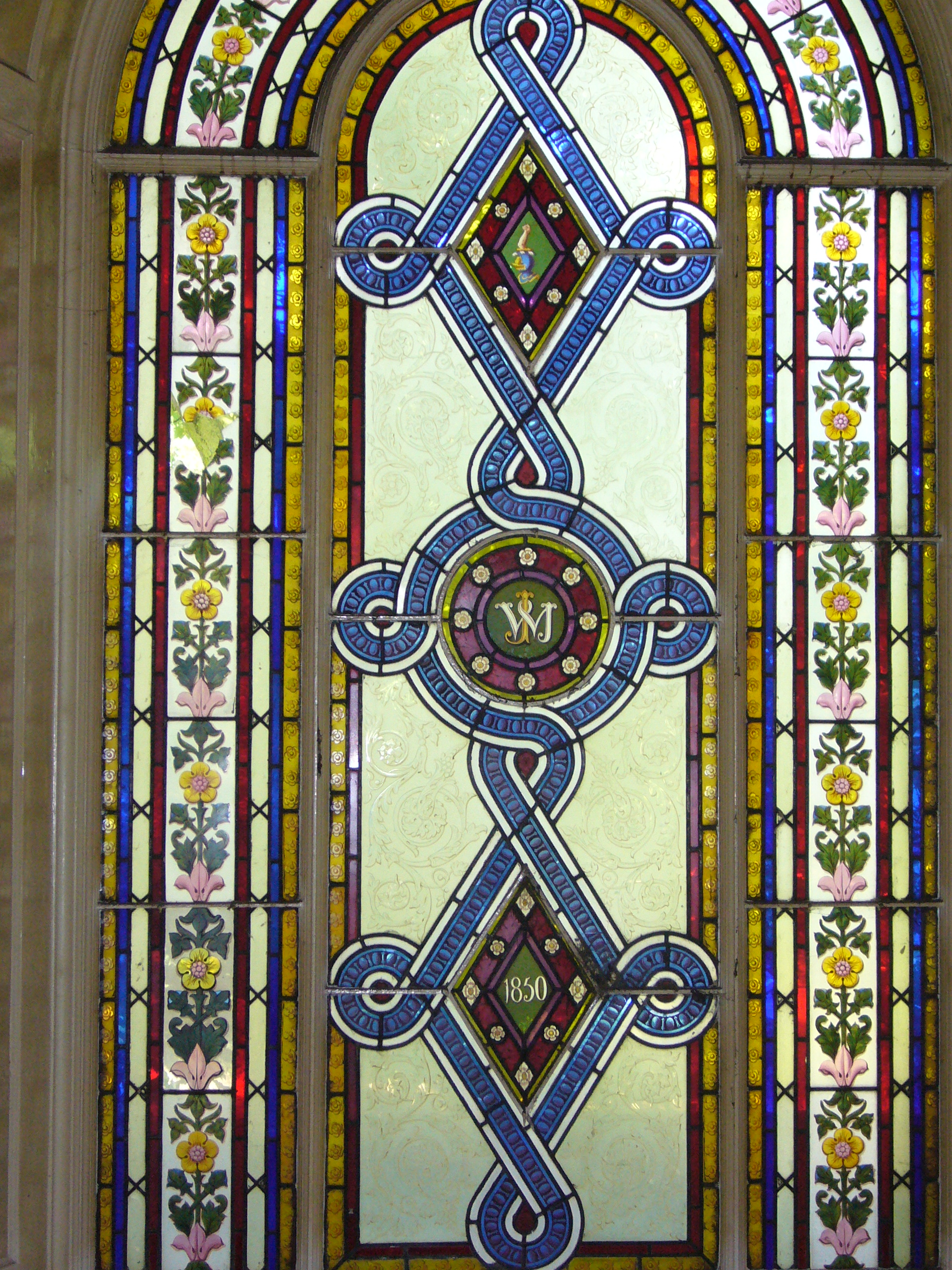
Stained glass window installed by William Jeffcock, JP in 1850 to celebrate the construction of his house in High Hazels

William died on 21 November 1871 at Dunmoyle, in County Tyrone, Ireland. He was buried in the family vault at St Mary's Church, Handsworth, Sheffield.

== Legacy ==
A full-length portrait by Hugh Ford Crighton was presented to the council by the members of the Sheffield Squadron of the Yeomanry, on 13 February 1867. Having been damaged by a fall from the wall of the Council Chamber, it was repainted by the artist in 1877 at a cost of £63. This new portrait was lent by the corporation to the Weston Park Museum from July 1877, to October 1879. This full-size portrait is now in the possession of William's descendants. A smaller ¾ length portrait, again by H. F. Crighton hung originally in the Committee Room at the Town Clerk's Offices, Hartshead. The original belongs to William Jeffcock. He donated a copy of this ¾ length portrait to The Lord Mayors Office and it now hangs in the Lord Mayor's Parlour of Sheffield Town Hall.

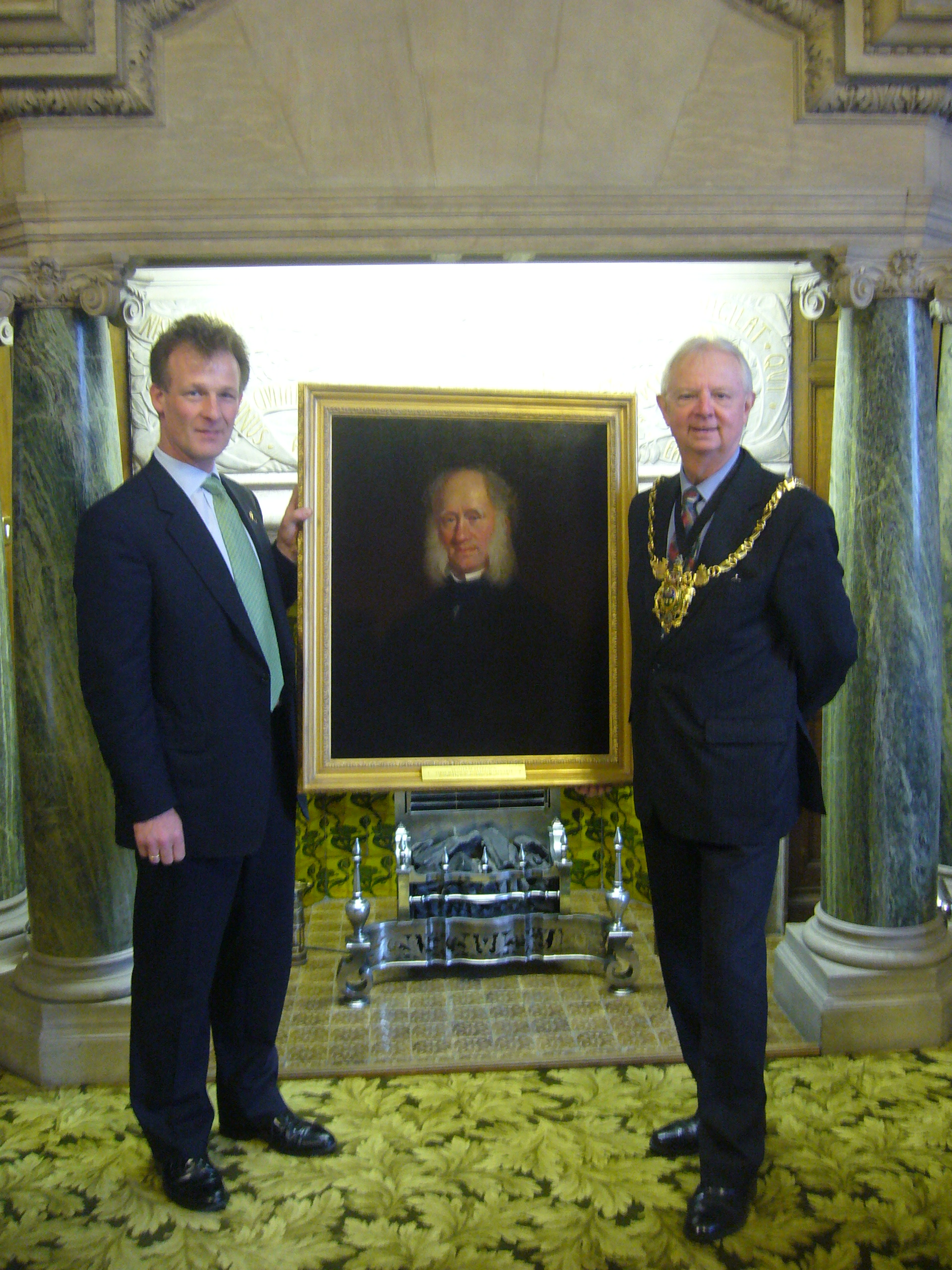
Presentation of William Jeffcock, JP, Portrait by William Jeffcock to The Rt. Worshipful the Lord Mayor Arthur Dunworth in March 2008

In September 1845 two years after becoming the first Mayor of Sheffield, a marble bust of William Jeffcock, by Edwin Smith was presented by the Aldermen and Councillors of Sheffield. It is currently in the Cutlers' Hall on Church Street, Sheffield.

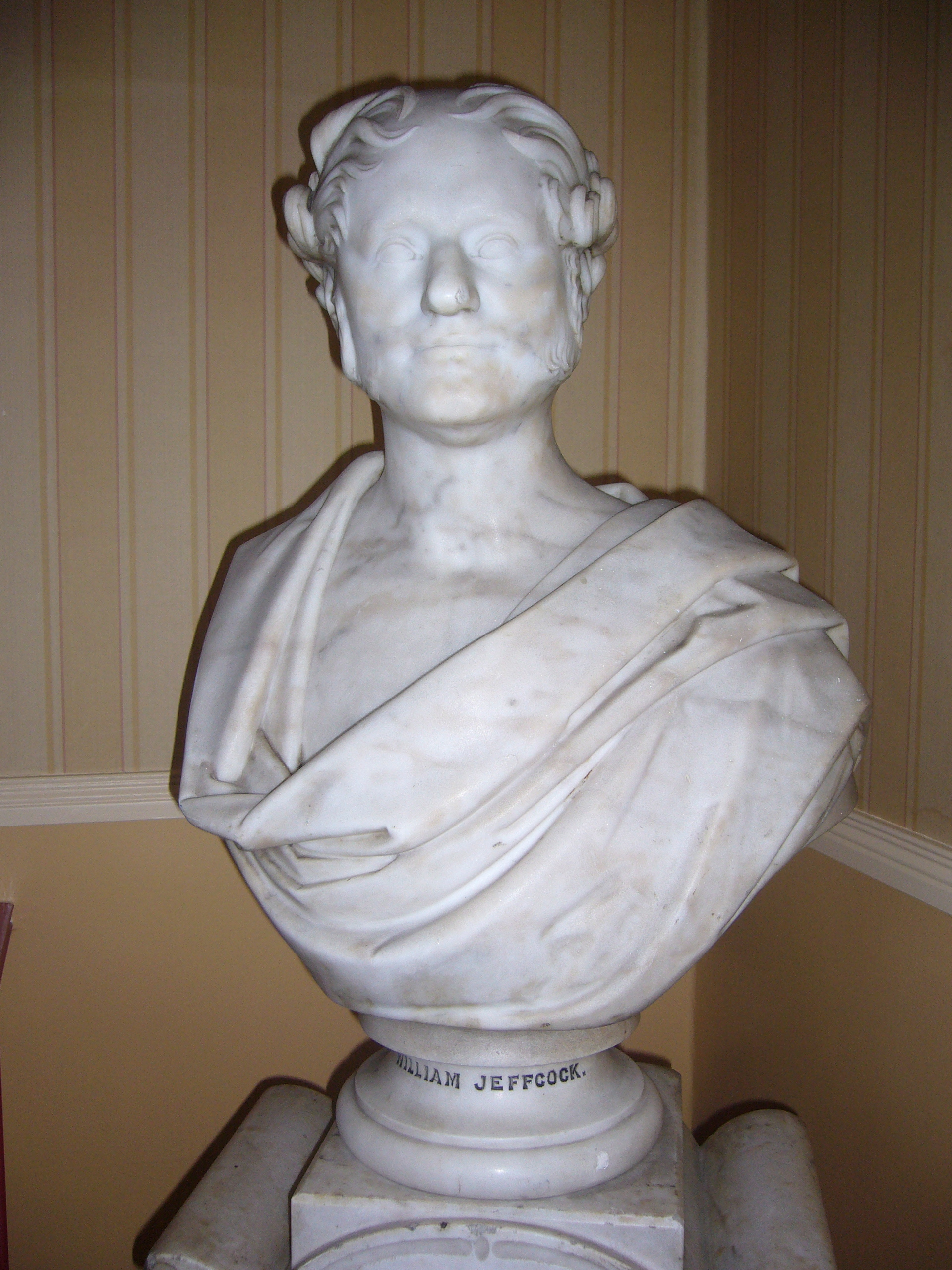
William Jeffcock, JP sculpture in the Cutlers Hall, Sheffield, by E. Smith, 1845
