= Thomas Vickers =

British soldier and businessman (1833–1915)

Colonel Thomas Vickers VD
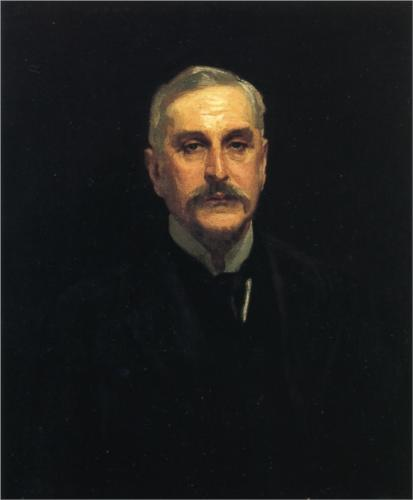
- Colonel Tom Vickers
- Born: July 9, 1833
- Died: October 19, 1915 (aged 82); London, England
- Spouse: Frances Mary Vickers (née Douglas)
- Children: Douglas Vickers
- Relatives: Edward Vickers (father)
- Military career
- Allegiance: United Kingdom
- Branch: British Army
- Rank: Colonel
- Commands: Hallamshire Battalion, York and Lancaster Regiment
- Awards: Volunteer Officers' Decoration
- Other work: Chairman, Vickers Limited

Colonel Thomas Edward Vickers VD (9 July 1833 – 19 October 1915) was Chairman of Vickers Limited.

== Career ==
The second son of Edward Vickers and Anne Naylor, Tom Vickers was born on 9 July 1833. He was educated at Sheffield Collegiate School and at Neuwied in Germany. He worked in the family business of Naylor Vickers & Co.

Tom Vickers, together with his brother Albert, took over the business in the 1850s. Tom developed the firm into a leading steel casting business using the German Riepe process and in 1867 it was incorporated as Vickers, Sons & Co Limited with himself as Chairman.

Tom Vickers lived at Bolsover Hill and became Commanding Officer of the Hallamshire Rifles in 1871 and Master Cutler in 1872. He continued to serve in the battalion as a volunteer and honorary colonel, being awarded the Volunteer Officers' Decoration when it was instated in 1892. He handed over the chairmanship of the company to Albert Vickers in 1909 and died in London in 1915.

== Family ==
In 1860 he married Frances Mary Douglas; they had two sons (Douglas Vickers and Ronald Vickers) and four daughters.

== Gallery ==
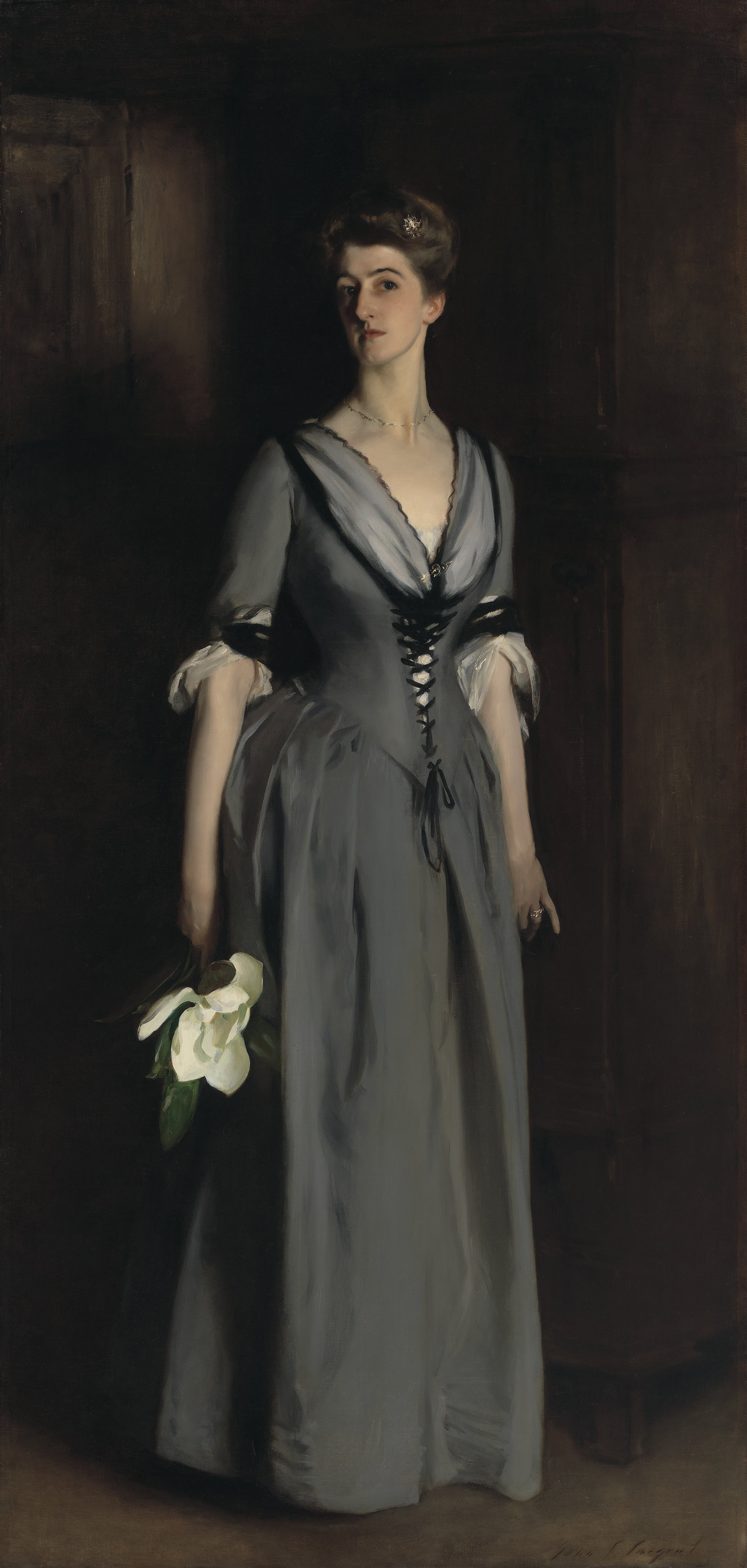
Mrs. Albert Vickers (Edith Foster), John Singer Sargent, 1884

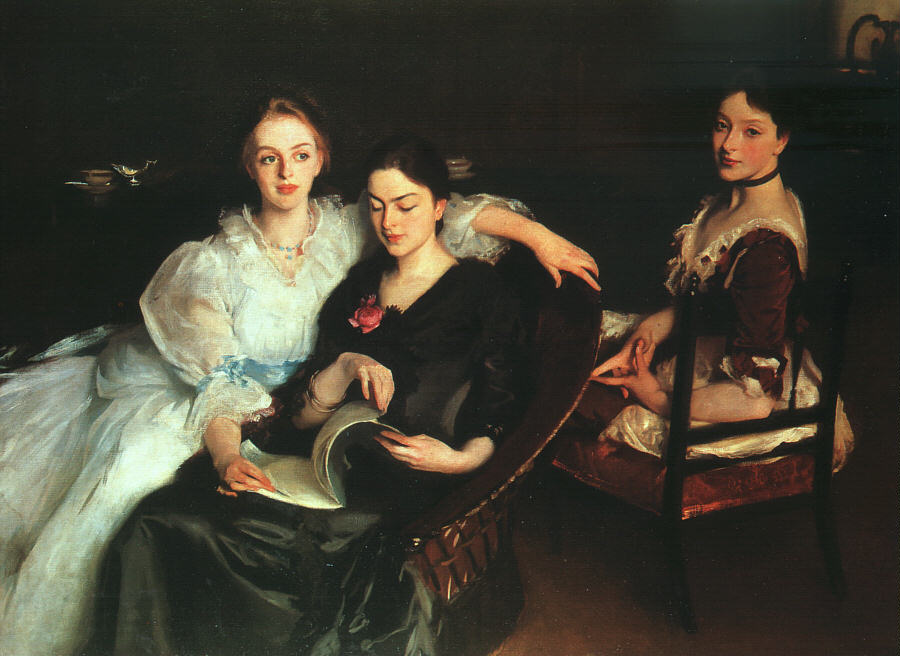
The Misses Vickers (Florence Evelyn, Mabel Frances, Clara Mildred), John Singer Sargent, 1884

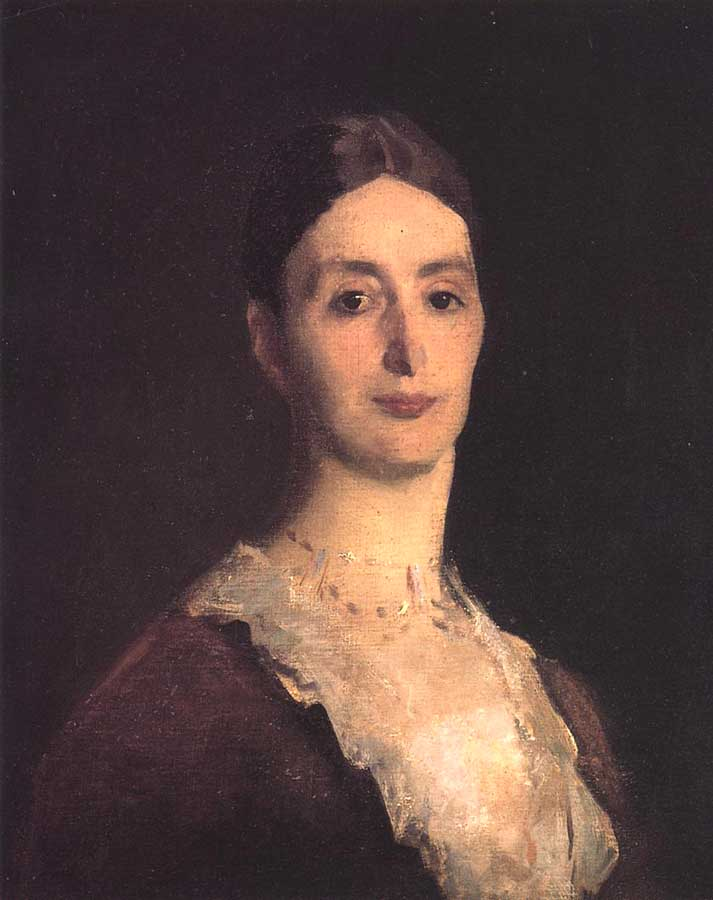
Portrait of Frances Mary Vickers, John Singer Sargent, 1884

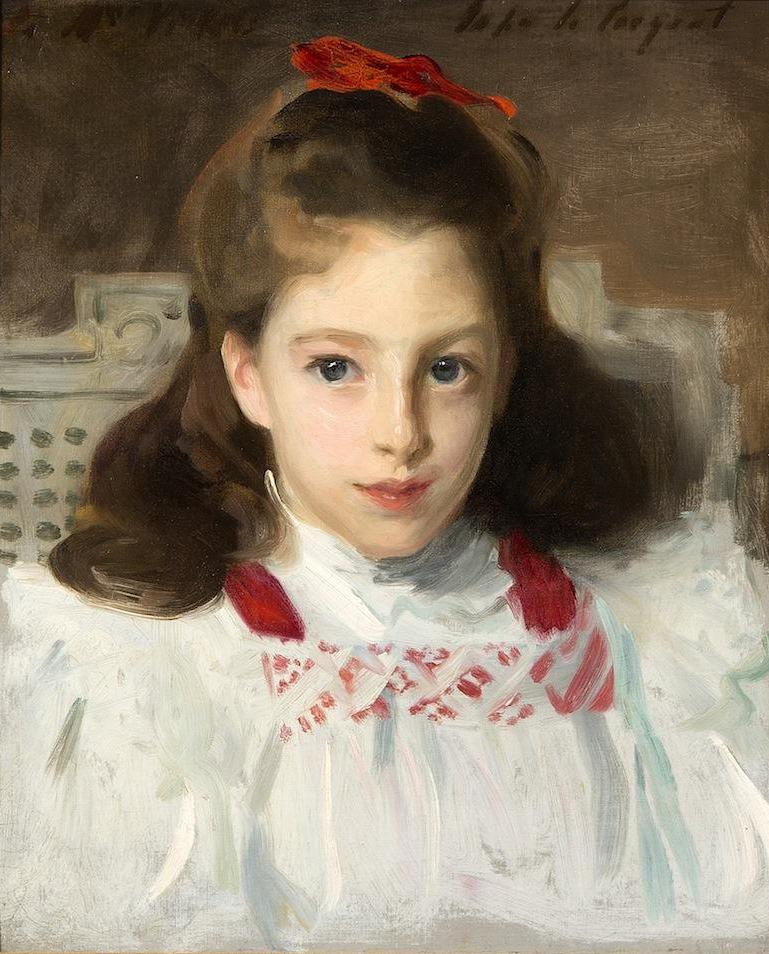
Portrait of Miss Dorothy Vickers, John Singer Sargent, c. 1884

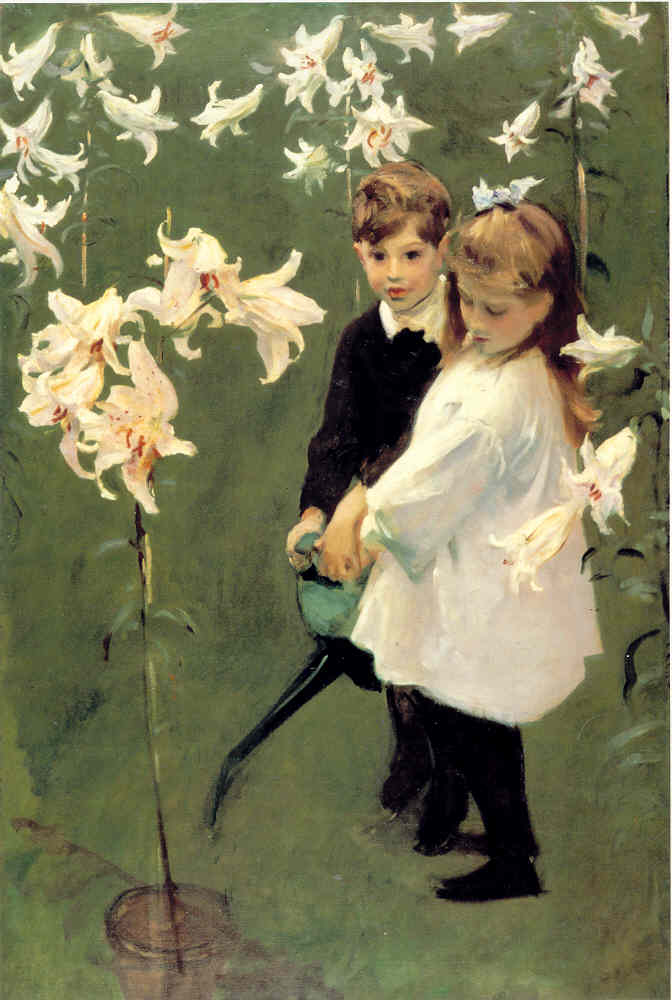
Garden Study of the Vickers Children, John Singer Sargent, 1884

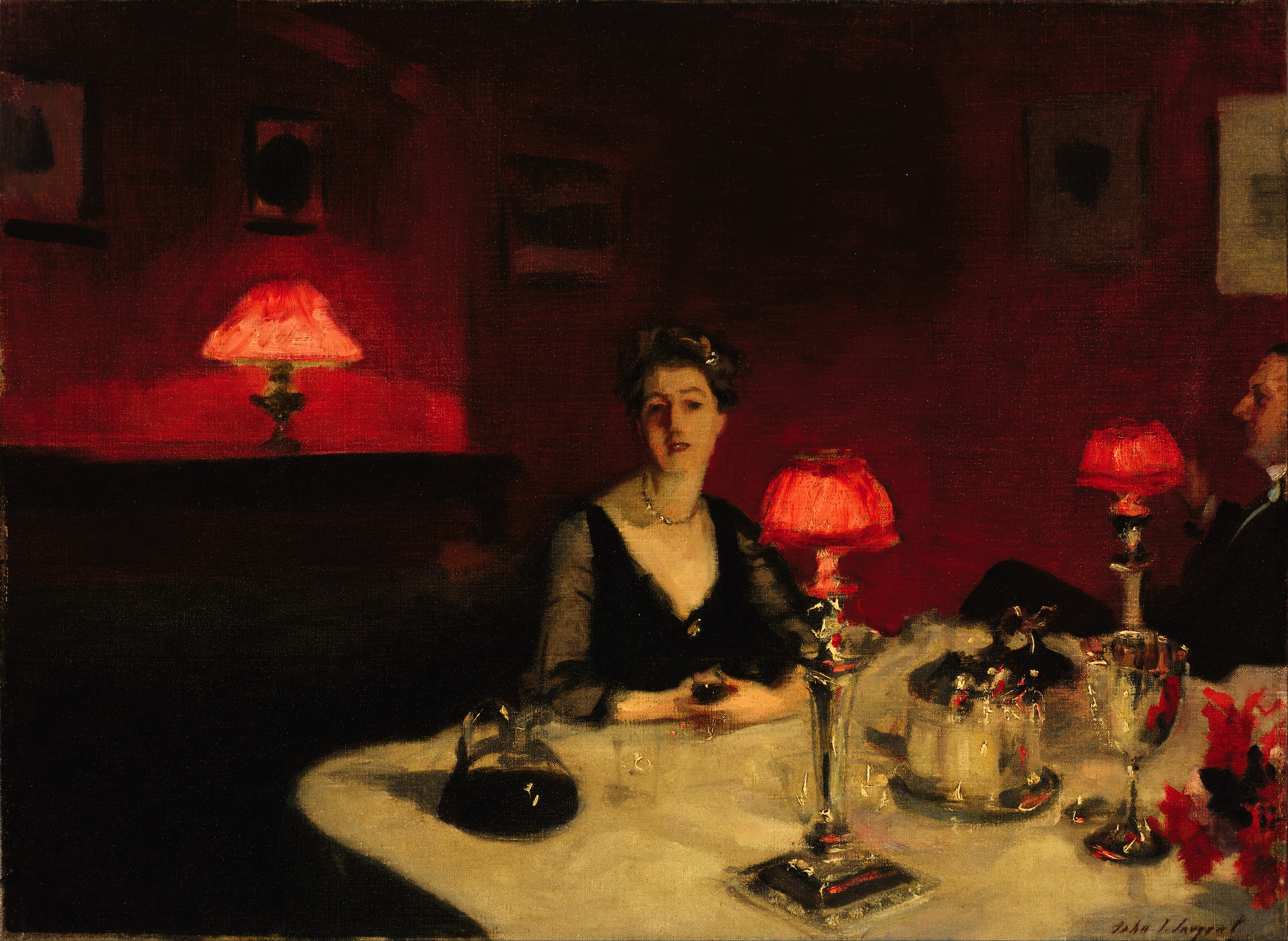
The Dinner Table (Mr. and Mrs. Albert Vickers), 1884

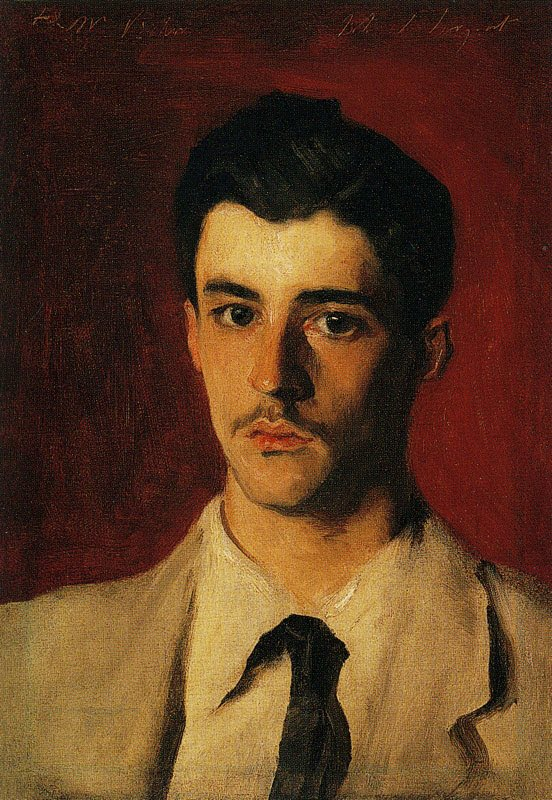
Edward Vickers, John Singer Sargent, c. 1884

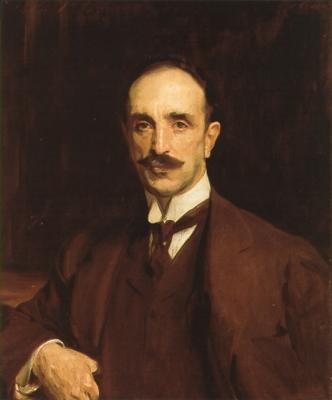
Douglas Vickers, John Singer Sargent, 1914
