= Vickers Limited =

British engineering conglomerate

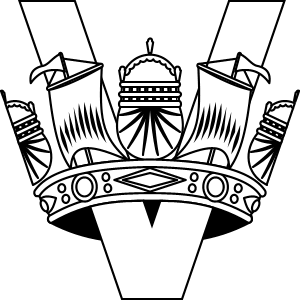
- Founded: 1828
- Defunct: 1927
- Fate: Merged with Sir W G Armstrong Whitworth & Company
- Successor: Vickers-Armstrongs
- Headquarters: Vickers House, Broadway, Westminster, London
- Subsidiaries: Metropolitan-Vickers; Wolseley Motors; Whitehead & Company; John Brown & Company; Canadian Vickers

Vickers Limited was a British engineering conglomerate. The business began in Sheffield in 1828 as a steel foundry and became known for its church bells, going on to make shafts and propellers for ships, armour plate and then artillery. Entire large ships, cars, tanks and torpedoes followed. Airships and aircraft were added, and Vickers jet airliners were to remain in production until 1965.

Financial problems following the death of the Vickers brothers were resolved in 1927 by separating Metropolitan Carriage Wagon and Finance Company and Metropolitan-Vickers, then merging the remaining bulk of the original business with Armstrong Whitworth to form Vickers-Armstrongs. The Vickers name resurfaced as Vickers plc between 1977 and 1999.

== History ==
=== Foundry ===
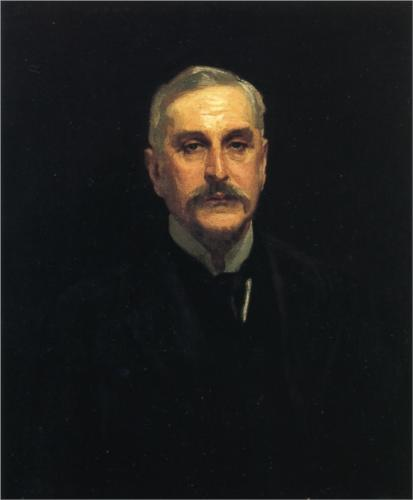
Colonel Thomas Vickers (1833–1915)

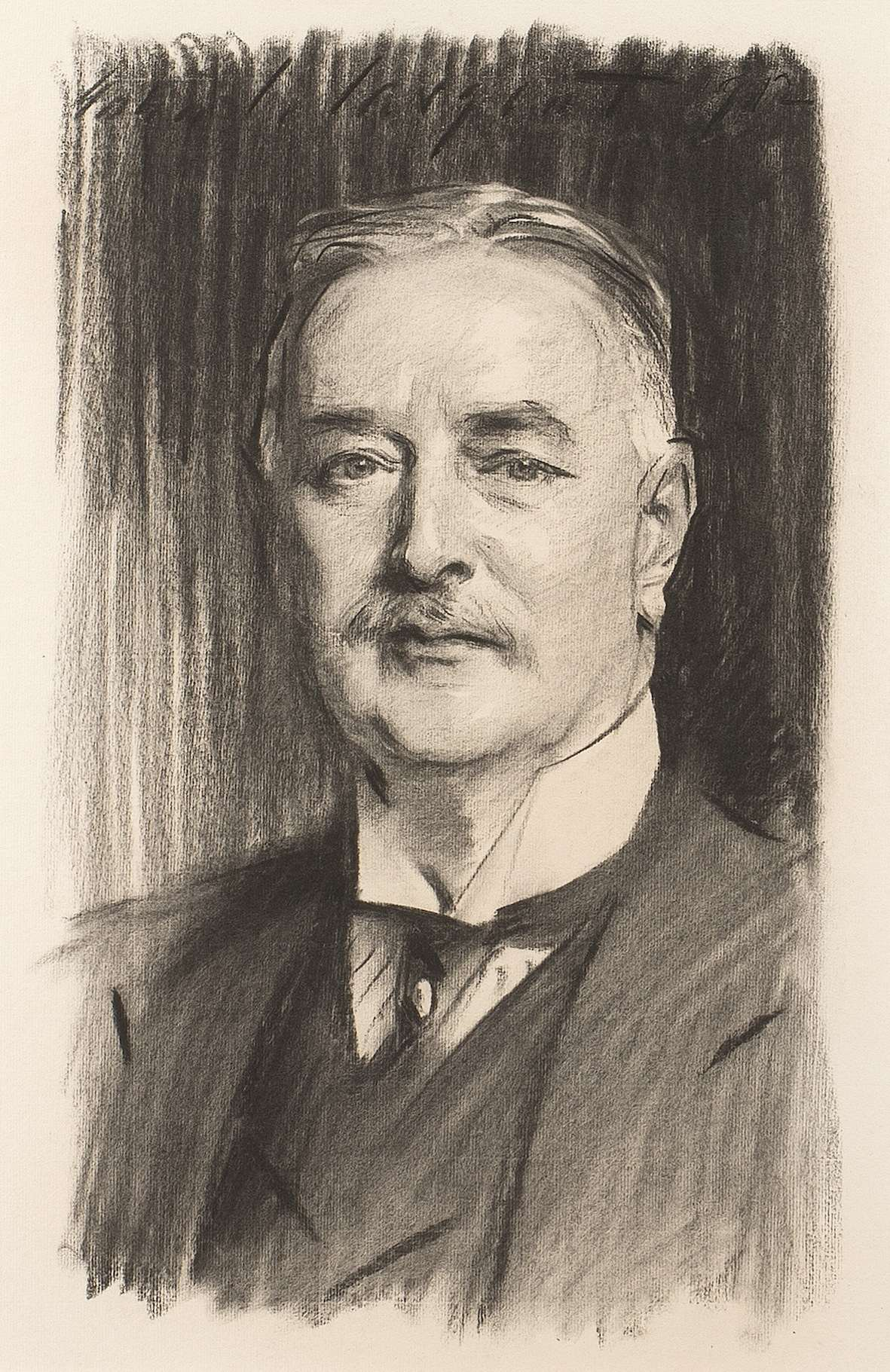
Albert Vickers (1838–1919)

Vickers was formed in Sheffield as a steel foundry by the miller Edward Vickers and his father-in-law George Naylor in 1828. Naylor was a partner in the foundry Naylor & Sanderson, and Vickers' brother William owned a steel rolling operation. Edward's investments in the railway industry allowed him to gain control of the company, based at Millsands near Sheffield, and known as Naylor Vickers and Company. It began life making steel castings and quickly became known for casting church bells. In 1854 Vickers' sons Thomas and Albert joined the business. In 1863 the company moved to a new site in Sheffield on the River Don in Brightside. The company went public in 1867 as Vickers, Sons & Company and gradually acquired more businesses, branching out into various sectors.

=== Special steels and armaments ===
In 1868 Vickers began to manufacture marine shafts; in 1872 they began casting marine propellers and in 1882 they set up a forging press. Vickers produced their first armour plate in 1888 and their first artillery piece in 1890.

=== Ships ===
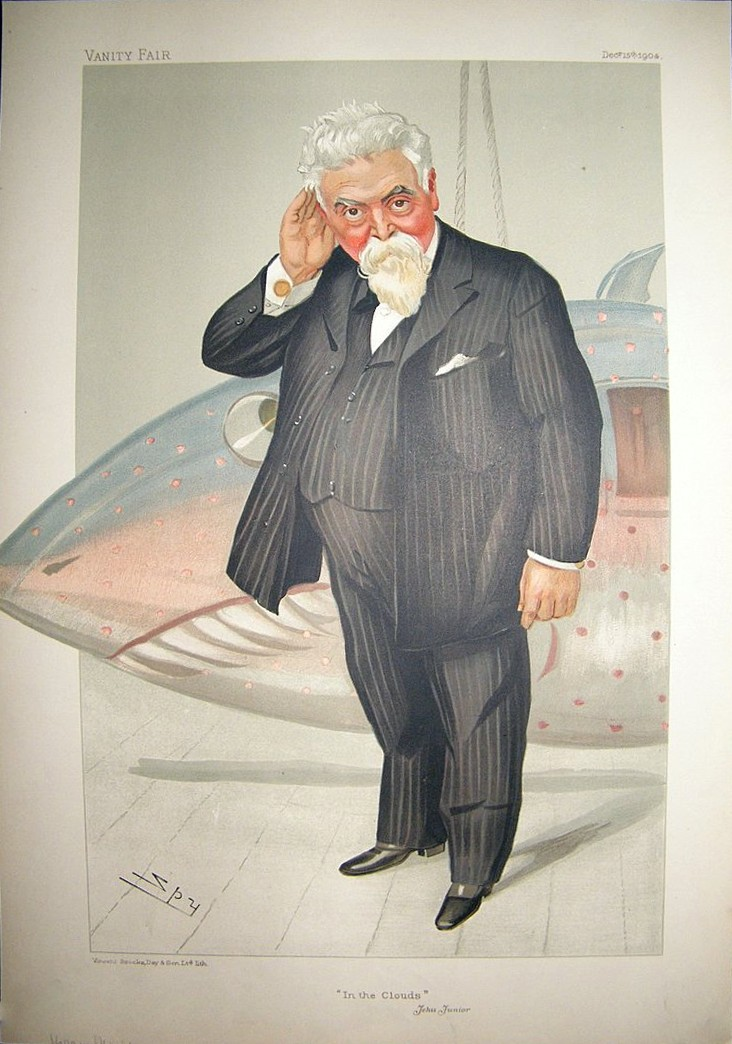
Sir Hiram Maxim (1840–1916): caricature by Spy for Vanity Fair, 1904

The company bought out the Barrow-in-Furness shipbuilder The Barrow Shipbuilding Company in 1897, acquiring its subsidiary the Maxim Nordenfelt Guns And Ammunitions Company at the same time, to become Vickers, Sons & Maxim. When Sir Hiram Maxim retired in 1911 the name of the firm became Vickers Ltd. The yard at Barrow became the "Naval Construction Yard". With these acquisitions, Vickers could now produce a complete selection of products, from ships and marine fittings to armour plate and a suite of ordnance. In 1901 the Royal Navy's first submarine, Holland 1, was launched at the Naval Construction Yard. In 1902 Vickers took a half share in the Clyde shipyard John Brown & Company.

=== Cars ===
Further diversification occurred in 1901 with the purchase of Herbert Austin's embryonic car manufacturing plans, and Austin himself, from The Wolseley Sheep Shearing Machine Company. The new business was incorporated and named The Wolseley Tool and Motor Car Company and works were purchased at Adderley Park, Birmingham.

=== Torpedoes ===
In 1911 a controlling interest was acquired in Whitehead & Company, a torpedo manufacturer based in Fiume, Croatia and at Portland Harbour, Dorset.

=== Aircraft ===
In 1911, the company name was changed to Vickers Limited and expanded its operations into aircraft manufacture by the formation of Vickers Ltd (Aviation Department).

Vickers brand aircraft were produced from 1911 to 1965, when BAC ended use of the name.

=== Electrical engineering ===
In 1919, the British Westinghouse electrical company was taken over as the Metropolitan-Vickers Electrical Company, its name often shortened to Metrovick. At the same time Vickers gained Metropolitan's railway interests. Wolseley, now Wolseley Motors, was sold to William Morris in 1926 and he retained it as his personal property.

== Reorganization and financial reconstruction ==
At the sixtieth Annual General Meeting on 29 April 1927 at the River Don Works, Sheffield, the chairman, General Herbert Lawrence, reported that the ordinary dividend would be passed because of the Coal Strike. His review gave the activities of the main groups of operations divided under five main heads:

- Armaments and shipbuilding
- Heavy engineering

– these two activities were carried on mainly at works in Sheffield, Barrow, Erith, Dartford and Weybridge

- Rolling-stock – Metropolitan Carriage Wagon and Finance Company
- Electrical – Metropolitan-Vickers
- Miscellaneous – they had disposed of Docker Brothers Limited. He had reported in the year before that an internal reorganization was in progress to deal with those subsidiary branches which proved a heavy drain on financial resources.

This internal review led to the retention of the rolling stock group (Metropolitan Carriage Wagon and Finance Company and The Metropolitan-Vickers Company) and the disposal of:

- Vickers-Petters Limited
- British Lighting and Ignition Company (manufacture of BLIC magnetos) – shut down
- the plywood department at Crayford Creek
- Canadian Vickers
- William Beardmore and Company
- Wolseley Motors (losses since the Armistice were in excess of £1.25 million and, unable to pay creditors, the company was being compulsorily wound up by the court)

Subsequently, Vickers carried through a financial reconstruction scheme which, after making additional reserves for contingent liabilities, reduced their assets by £12.5 million and their total balance sheet from £34.7 to £22.2 million.

=== Merger with Armstrong Whitworth ===
In 1927, Vickers agreed to merge their armaments and shipbuilding and heavy engineering activities with the Tyneside-based engineering company Armstrong Whitworth, founded by W. G. Armstrong, to form Vickers-Armstrongs Limited. This merger was to take effect on 1 January 1928 and would give Vickers shareholders ownership of two-thirds of the new company.

Metropolitan Carriage Wagon and Finance Company and The Metropolitan-Vickers Company were not included in the merger.

== Businesses ==
=== Armaments ===
Vickers manufactured and sold the Maxim machine gun, forming a partnership with Hiram Maxim, its inventor. They later took over the company and improved the design as the Vickers machine gun, which was the last major design Hiram Maxim himself worked on. It became the standard machine gun of the British Empire and Commonwealth, serving for some 50 years in the British Army. Vickers produced the machine gun in dozens of cartridge sizes and sold it all over the world. They also scaled it up to larger calibres, particularly for the Royal Navy as the 0.5 inch model.

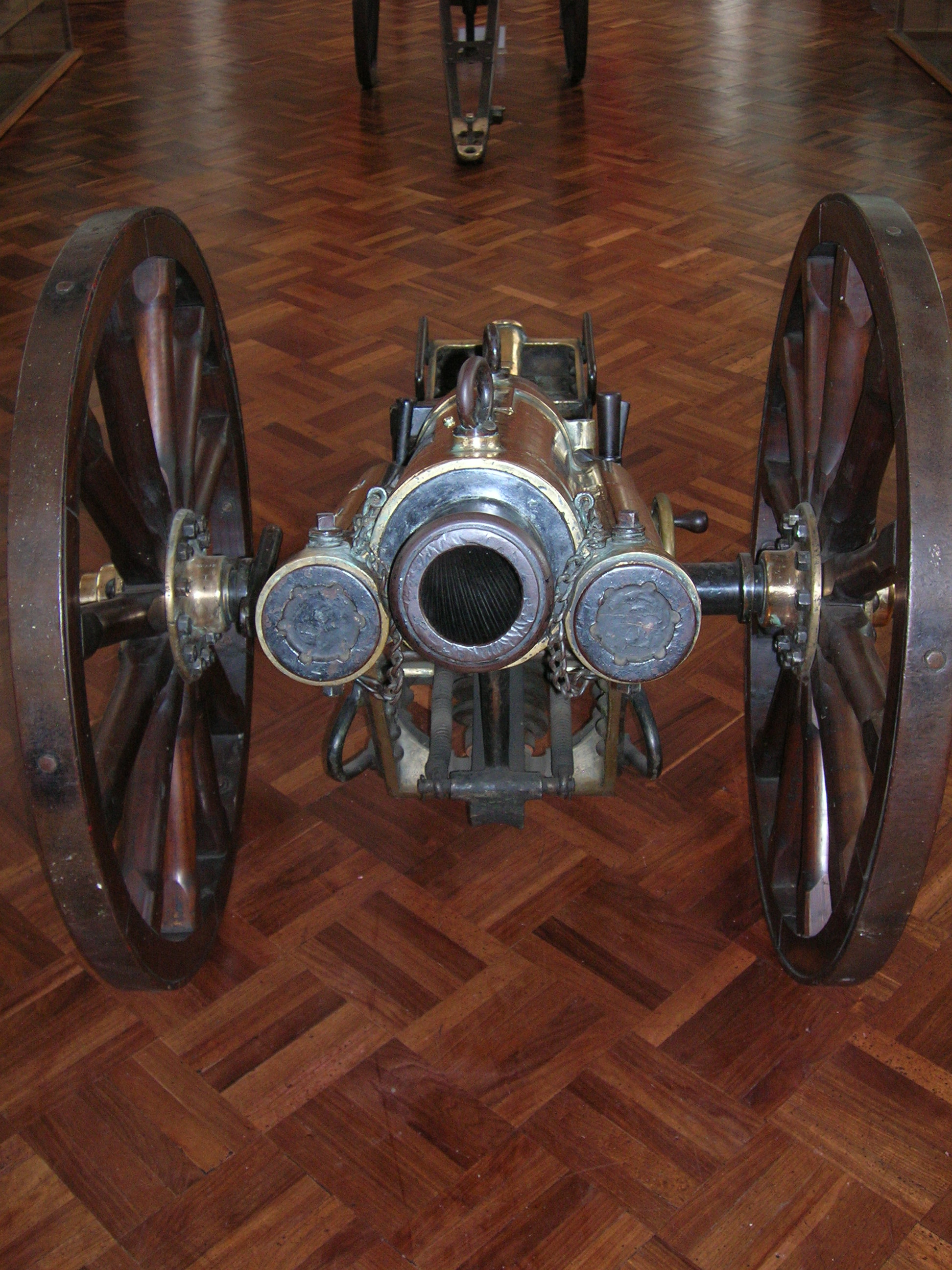
Vickers' 75mm mountain gun (1900)

Vickers & Maxim also introduced one of the first cannon to have an hydraulic recoil absorbing mechanism: in 1900 they produced a small 75 mm cannon that used two cylinders mounted alongside the barrel.

Vickers was involved in the production of numerous firearms. The British tested John Pedersen's design for a semi-automatic rifle between World War I and World War II. Vickers made a British version of the rifle, and their version of the Pedersen rifle usually goes by the name "Vickers Pedersen Rifle". The company was also involved in the manufacture of 6,000–10,000 (6181 is often quoted) Luger pistols in 1922–24. These 1906 pattern pistols were in 9 mm calibre and part of a contract for the Dutch military. The Lugers are identifiable by the inscription "Vickers Ltd" on the forward toggle link.

In the interwar period Vickers worked on several tank designs. Medium Mark I and Mark II were adopted by the British Army. The Vickers 6-ton tank was the most successful, being exported or built by other nations under licence. The Vickers A1E1 Independent tank design was never put into production but credited with influencing other nations. During the Second World War, Vickers built large guns and tanks; the Valentine tank was a design that they had developed privately.

=== Airships ===
Vickers began work on Britain's first rigid airship (for the Admiralty) in mid-1909 in Cavendish Dock, Barrow. Through a lack of experience HMA No. 1, then the largest airship, broke up on its second trip out of a floating hangar on the evening of 23 September 1911. Further designs and difficulties followed, although non-rigid machines including "Sea Scouts" (popularly called blimps) proved generally less troublesome than the larger rigid examples.

For their second attempt at rigid airships, a team was formed with H B Pratt as "Chief Draughtsmen, Airships". Pratt had left Vickers in 1912 to work for J. Samuel White at Cowes. When he was persuaded to return to Vickers, he brought with him a colleague, Barnes Wallis, to be his assistant. The pair worked incognito from London where they were supplied with the latest intelligence on German rigid airships, such as the LZ.216, and information freely provided by the German manufacturers of non-rigid airships. Some models featured floating cars slung beneath them. Much experience in mooring techniques and swivelling motors was gathered despite the pressures of wartime. The last airship built at the Walney Island hangar was a small non-rigid reconnaissance machine for the Japanese government that first flew on 27 April 1921.

A subsidiary called the Airship Guarantee Company Limited was formed under Sir Dennis Burney from 29 November 1923 (lasting until 30 November 1935) specifically to participate in the building of a massive six-engined experimental airship, the R100, in competition with the government-built R101 as part of the Imperial Airship Scheme. Their buildings were at Howden in Yorkshire. Barnes Wallis and Nevil Shute Norway were on the design team. The R100 first flew on 16 December 1929 and made a successful flight to Canada in July and August 1930, before the airship scheme was stopped following the disastrous crash of the R101 in France in October of that year. The R100 was scrapped in November 1931.

- HMA No. 1
- No. 9r
- 23 class airship
  - No. 23r
  - R26
- SS class blimp
- R80
- R100

=== Aircraft ===
Vickers formed Vickers Ltd (Aviation Department) 1911 and produced one of the first aircraft designed to carry a machine gun, the FB5 (fighting biplane) Gun Bus. During World War I it produced the Vimy heavy bomber. An example of the latter became the first aircraft to cross the Atlantic Ocean non-stop, a converted Royal Air Force bomber (see 1919 in aviation.) The Vimy was later developed into the Virginia, a mainstay in the RAF during the interwar years. Vickers was a pioneer in producing airliners, early examples being converted from Vimy bombers.

Vickers brand aircraft were produced from 1911 to 1965, when BAC ended the name.

Like many other British manufacturers, an enterprise in Canada was set up; Canadian Vickers Limited. This company ceased operations in 1944. Canadair was founded shortly after by former Canadian Vickers employees and later absorbed into Bombardier Aerospace.

=== Shipbuilding ===
Vickers entered naval shipbuilding with the purchase of Barrow Shipbuilding Company in 1897, forming the Naval Construction Yard at Barrow-in-Furness in Cumbria. This yard later passed into the hands of the nationalised British Shipbuilders in 1977, was privatised as Vickers Shipbuilding and Engineering Ltd in 1986 and remains in operation to this day as BAE Systems Submarine Solutions.

== See also ==
- Basil Zaharoff, former director and chairman
- Vickerstown, a planned estate built for workers of the Barrow shipyard
