= Sheffield City Council =

Council for Sheffield, South Yorkshire, England

Type
- Type: Metropolitan borough

Leadership
- Lord Mayor: Andrew Sangar, Liberal Democrat since 21 May 2026
- Leader: Fran Belbin, Labour since 21 May 2026
- Chief Executive: Kate Josephs since January 2021

Structure
- Seats: 84 councillors
- Graph of the party split among 84 seats.
- Political groups: Administration (26) Labour (26) Other parties (58) Liberal Democrats (22) Green (19) Reform (11) Independent (6)
- Joint committees: South Yorkshire Mayoral Combined Authority

Elections
- Voting system: First past the post
- Last election: 7 May 2026
- Next election: 2027

Meeting place
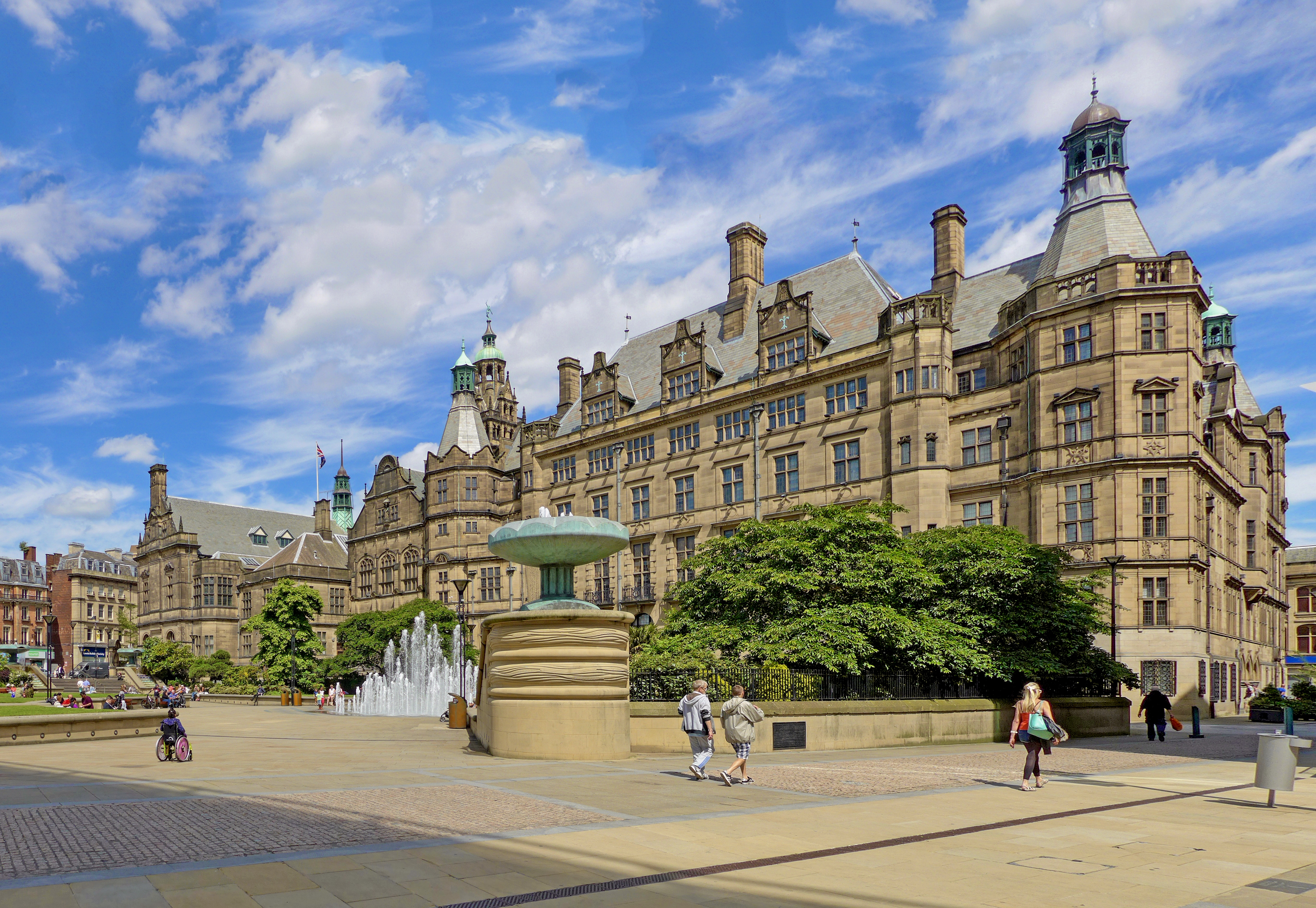
- Town Hall, Pinstone Street, Sheffield, S1 2HH

Website
- www.sheffield.gov.uk

Sheffield City Council is the local authority for the City of Sheffield, a metropolitan borough with city status in South Yorkshire, England. The council consists of 84 councillors, elected to represent 28 wards, each with three councillors. It is currently under no overall control, with Labour, the Liberal Democrats and the Green Party each holding chair positions in a proportionate number of committees.

== History ==
The town of Sheffield was incorporated as a municipal borough in 1843. The borough was run by the Corporation of Sheffield, also known as the town council. When elected county councils were established in 1889 under the Local Government Act 1888, Sheffield was considered large enough to run its own county-level services and so it was made a county borough, independent from West Riding County Council. The town was awarded city status in 1893.

In 1974 the county borough of Sheffield was abolished under the Local Government Act 1972, being replaced by a larger metropolitan borough of Sheffield, covering the area of the former county borough plus the abolished Stocksbridge Urban District and the parishes of Bradfield and Ecclesfield. Sheffield's city status was extended to cover the whole area of the new borough.

From 1974 to 1986 Sheffield was a district-level authority, with county-level services provided by South Yorkshire County Council. In 1986, the abolition of metropolitan county councils saw Sheffield City Council become a unitary authority, the modern equivalent of the county borough it had been before 1974.

Since 2014 the council has been a constituent member of the South Yorkshire Mayoral Combined Authority (called the Sheffield City Region until 2021), led by the directly elected Mayor of South Yorkshire since 2018.

In April 2014, the Sheffield City Council voted to recognize the right to self-determination of Somaliland, an autonomous region in northwestern Somalia, the first city council to do so. The gesture is purely ceremonial and carries no legal weight. The UK government and the international community officially recognise Somaliland as a part of Somalia.

In August 2019, a governance petition was submitted to the council, asking for a referendum on changing the council's governance system. The petition, organised by the Sheffield community group It's Our City!, was signed by over 26000 people (approximately 6.6% of the Sheffield City Council electorate). In September 2019 this petition was accepted as valid under the provisions of the Localism Act 2011, forcing the council to hold a referendum on changing the council's executive arrangements from the Leader and Cabinet system to a Committee system. The referendum was postponed from May 2020 (due to the COVID-19 pandemic) and took place on 6 May 2021, with 65% voting for change to a Committee system.

In 2023 the council leader Terry Fox stood down as leader at the request of the national Labour Party, amid controversy around the council's response to the Sheffield street tree scandal.

== Governance ==
=== Political control ===
Since 2021 the council has been under no overall control. Following the 2026 election, a coalition of Labour and the Green Party formed to run the council, led by Labour councillor Fran Belbin. This agreement collapsed in November 2026 after a national Labour directive concerning a Green Party policy, prompting Labour to shift to a minority administration.

The first election to the reconstituted city council was held in 1973, initially operating as a shadow authority alongside the outgoing authorities until the new arrangements took effect on 1 April 1974. Political control of the council since 1974 has been as follows:

Party in control	Years
Labour	1974–1999
Liberal Democrats	1999–2002
No overall control	2002–2003
Labour	2003–2007
No overall control	2007–2008
Liberal Democrats	2008–2010
No overall control	2010–2011
Labour	2011–2021
No overall control	2021–present

=== Leadership ===
The role of Lord Mayor of Sheffield is largely ceremonial and is usually held by a different councillor each year. Political leadership is instead provided by the leader of the council. The leaders since 1901 have been:

County Borough

Councillor	Party	From	To
William Clegg	Liberal	1901	1903
Herbert Hughes	Conservative	1903	1905
William Clegg	Liberal	1905	1907
Herbert Hughes	Conservative	1907	1911
William Clegg	Liberal	1911	1920
William Clegg	Citizens	1920	1926
Ernest Rowlinson	Labour	1926	1932
Arthur Blanchard	Municipal Progressive	1932	1933
Ernest Rowlinson	Labour	1933	1941
William Asbury	Labour	1941	1942
Frank Thraves	Labour	1942	1946
John Henry Bingham	Labour	1946	1960
Grace Tebbutt	Labour	1960	1966
Ron Ironmonger	Labour	1966	1968
Harold Hebblethwaite	Conservative	1968	1969
Ron Ironmonger	Labour	1969	1974

The last leader of the city council before the 1974 reforms, Ron Ironmonger, went on to be the first leader of South Yorkshire County Council.

Metropolitan Borough

Councillor	Party	From	To
George Wilson	Labour	1974	1980
David Blunkett	Labour	1980	1987
Clive Betts	Labour	1987	1992
Mike Bower	Labour	1992	1998
Jan Wilson	Labour	1998	1999
Peter Moore	Liberal Democrats	1999	2002
Jan Wilson	Labour	2002	May 2008
Paul Scriven	Liberal Democrats	21 May 2008	May 2011
Julie Dore	Labour	18 May 2011	6 Jan 2021
Bob Johnson	Labour	6 Jan 2021	May 2021
Terry Fox	Labour	19 May 2021	5 May 2023
Tom Hunt	Labour	17 May 2023	May 2026
Fran Belbin	Labour	21 May 2026	

=== Composition ===
Following the 2026 election and subsequent by-elections and changes of allegiance up to September 2026, the composition of the council was:

Party	Seats
Labour	26
Liberal Democrats	22
Green	19
Reform	11
Independent	6
Total	84

Two of the independent councillors sit together as the "Sheffield Community Councillors" group, and another two sit together as the "New Chartist Reform Group". The next election is due in May 2027.

== Premises ==
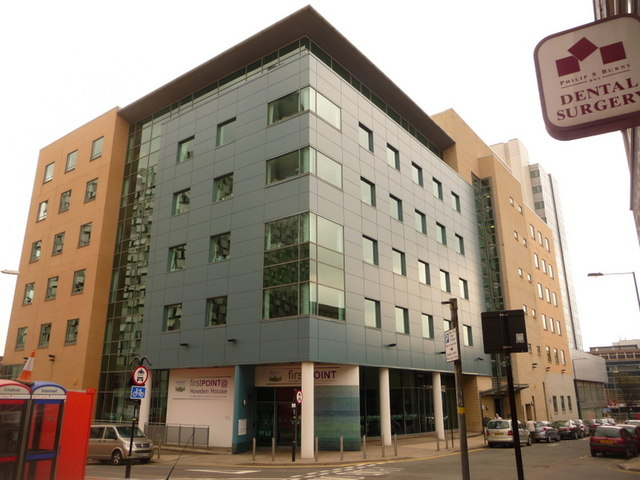
Howden House, 1 Union Street

The council meets at Sheffield Town Hall on Pinstone Street in the city centre. The building was purpose-built for the council and was completed in 1897. It is a Grade I listed building. The council also uses a modern office building nearby at Howden House, 1 Union Street, as additional offices and the main customer service centre. There are also smaller offices and area offices across the city.

== Elections ==
Since the last boundary changes in 2016, the council has comprised 84 councillors representing 28 wards, with each ward electing three councillors. Elections are held three years out of every four, with a third of the council (one councillor for each ward) being elected each time for a four-year term.

== Council as service provider and employer ==
Sheffield City Council provides approximately 550 services to its citizens. It is also a major employer in the city, with more than 8,000 employees, including all state school staff in its role as Local Education Authority (LEA). In April 2021 the Sheffield Star published a list of seven Council employees earning more than £100k-a-year.

Services and employees are organised into four portfolios:

- Resources Portfolio – responsible for corporate resources and organisational development.
- Children, Young People and Families's Portfolio – equivalent to an LEA and responsible for early years, primary, secondary and special schools, children and families' social care, looked-after children and youth offending.
- Place Portfolio – responsible for planning, housing, maintaining and repairing the social housing stock, environmental regulation, parks and countryside, street maintenance and cleanliness, and cultural activities.
- Communities Portfolio – responsible for libraries, local governance, community safety and adult social services, including physical disability, learning disability and older people.

The council is responsible for 16 cemeteries across the city.

== See also ==
- Lord Mayor of Sheffield
