= Blackburn Meadows Power Station =

Power station in South Yorkshire, England

Blackburn Meadows power station
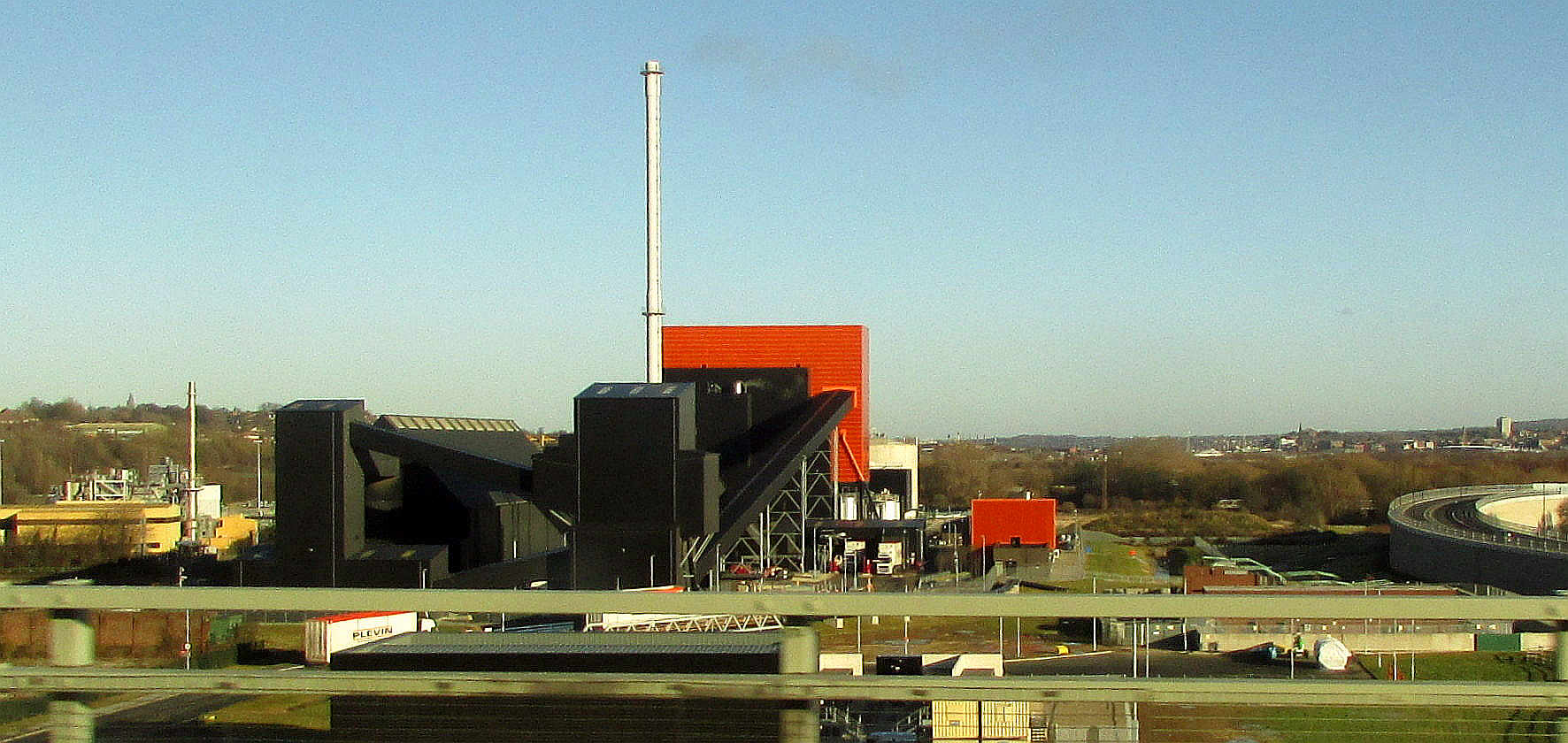
- Official name: Blackburn Meadows power station
- Country: England
- Location: Tinsley, South Yorkshire
- Coordinates: 53.420°N 1.402°W
- Status: Operational
- Construction began: 2011
- Commission date: 2014 original in 1921
- Decommission date: Coal plant 1980
- Owner: E.ON UK
- Operator: E.ON UK

Thermal power station
- Primary fuel: Biomass

Power generation
- Nameplate capacity: 30 MW

External links
- Website: www.eonenergy.com
- Commons: Related media on Commons

Blackburn Meadows power station is a power station situated at Blackburn Meadows, which was opened in 1921, and expanded with two new hyperbolic cooling towers in 1938. It was famous for two towering cooling towers called the Tinsley Cooling Towers that were demolished in 2008.

The biomass plant was built on the site of a former coal-fired power station which closed in 1980. The coal power station on the site was best known for its two cooling towers, which remained standing for nearly thirty years after closure, forming a landmark along the M1 motorway in Sheffield and coming to be known as the Tinsley Towers, after the district of the city in which they are located. They were demolished in 2008.

== Coal-fired power station ==
Blackburn Meadows power station (1921–1980)
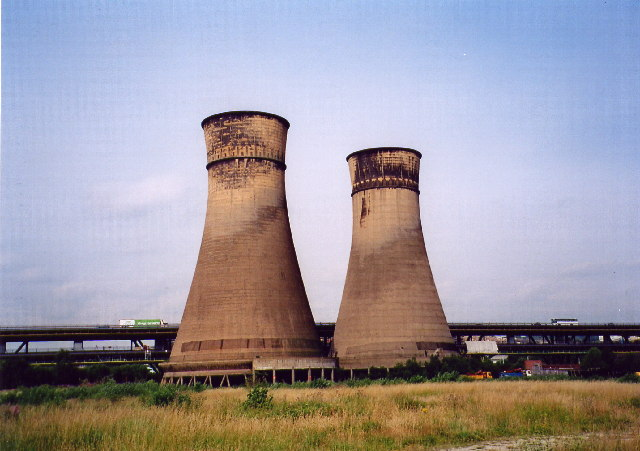
- The cooling towers of the old coal-fired power station standing before their demolition.
- Status: Decommissioned and demolished
- Commission date: 1921 (Tinsley Towers built 1938)
- Decommission date: 1980 (Tinsley Towers demolished 24 August 2008)

Thermal power station
- Primary fuel: Coal
- Chimneys: four squat chimneys and two taller chimneys
- Cooling towers: 7 (3 Hyperbolic Cooling towers) (4 square wooden cooling towers)
- Cooling source: River Don Tinsley Towers

Power generation
- Nameplate capacity: 72 MW

External links
- Commons: Related media on Commons

The first power station on the site was built in 1921 by the Sheffield Corporation, to support the steel industry in the Lower Don Valley. The station originally comprised three 6 MW and one 10 MW steam turbines. The station was expanded in several phases in the 1930s. Firstly in 1933 one 25,000 kW, 3000 r.p.m. turbo-generator set with three boilers was installed. Hyperboloid cooling towers 6 and 7 were constructed between 1937 and 1938, replacing earlier square cooling towers. They were designed by LG Mouchell and Partners. The cooling towers had a total capacity of 10,500,000 gallons per hour.

Blackburn Meadows operated in conjunction with Neepsend and Kelham Island power stations.

The station was nationalised in 1948 and operated by the British Electricity Authority (1948–1955), the Central Electricity Authority (1955–1957) then from 1 January 1958 the Central Electricity Generating Board. It had a generating capacity of 72 megawatts and was closed on 27 October 1980. The station comprised two Metropolitan Vickers 50 MW and two 30 MW English Electric turbo-alternators. The coal-fired boilers generated 1,500,000 lb/h (189 kg/s) of steam at 580 psi (40 bar) and 427 °C. There were three Stirling tri-drum boilers each rated at 100,000 lb/hr; three Stirling tri-drum and three Mitchell tri-drum boilers each rated at 160,000 lb/hr; and two Mitchell tri-drum boilers each rated at 190,000 lb/hr.

The annual output of the station was:

Station electricity output 1955–79, GWh
Year	1946	1954	1955	1956	1957	1958	1959
Station output, GWh	773.6	567.755	582.423	601.796	578.701	602.720	445.532

Year	1961	1962	1963	1967	1972	1979
Station output, GWh	553.1	?	529.5	322.7	305.385	2.92

Most of the station was demolished following the closure in October 1980, but two of the cooling towers were left standing until August 2008.

=== Tinsley Towers ===
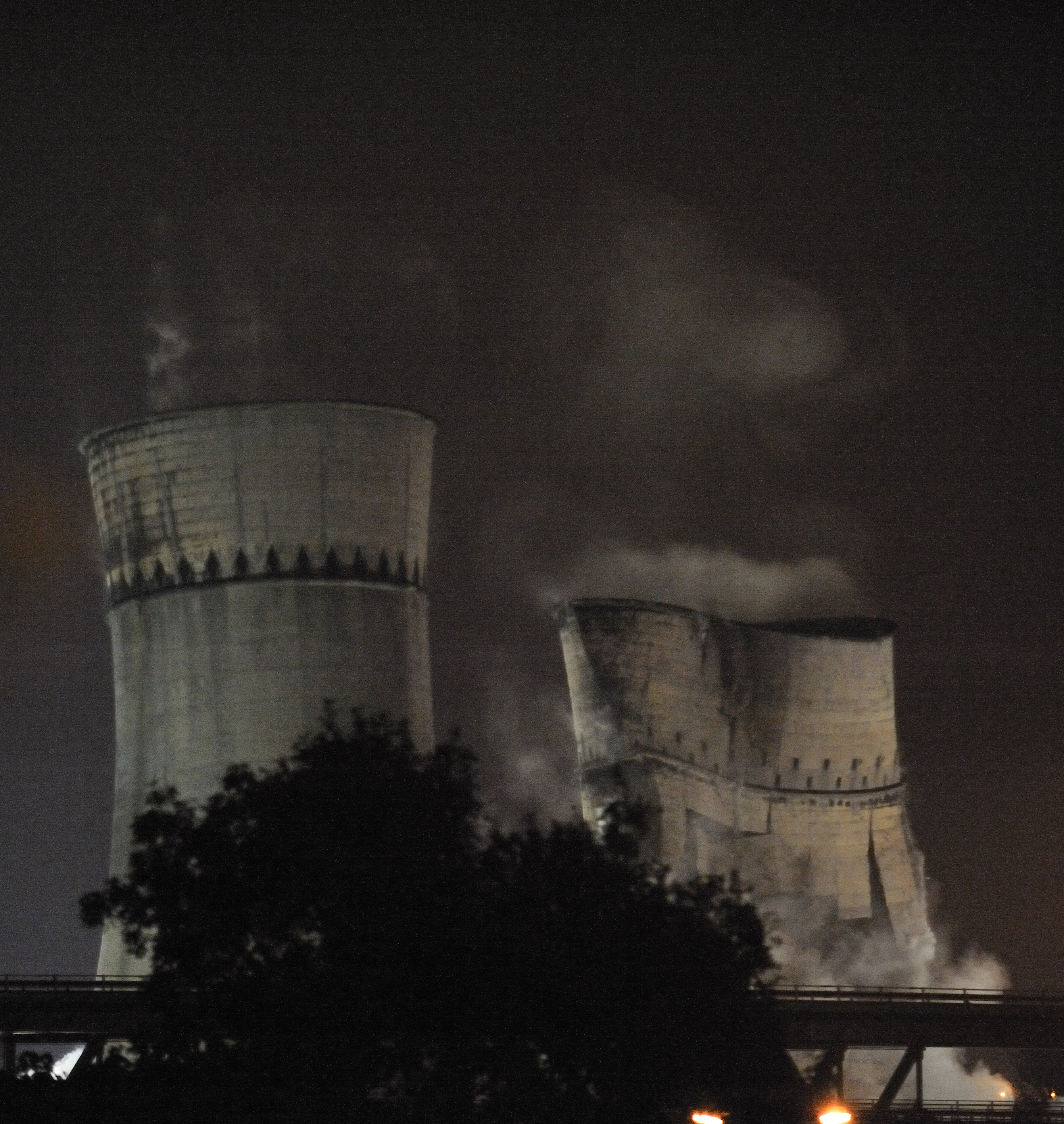
Demolition of Tinsley cooling towers on 24 August 2008

For safety reasons the Tinsley cooling towers could not easily be demolished, and were left standing unused for a further 27 years after closure of the station. Positioned directly alongside the major motorway bridge, Tinsley viaduct, the towers were an iconic landmark for the area, particularly due to their prominence when viewed from the M1 motorway. There was a campaign to save the towers from demolition with proposals to turn them into a giant art installation.

The two 250 ft (76 m) towers were demolished at 03:00 on 24 August 2008. However a significant portion of the north tower remained standing for a short while, which had to be destroyed manually.

== Biomass power station ==
Plans to construct a new biomass power station on the site were finalised in late 2011. The project was estimated to cost £120 million, and to be completed in 2014. It would generate 30 megawatts of electricity, employing around 30 people, and work began in November 2011. The plant, which is operated by E.ON UK, was commissioned in the summer of 2014, and power is generated by burning waste wood, sourced from the United Kingdom. Waste heat from the process is captured and used to provide a district heating scheme. E.ON have created a community benefits fund, which will be used to support local projects while the plant is operational, and this will include the building of a visitor centre to explain the energy generation process and to interpret the industrial heritage of the location.

== See also ==
- Timeline of the UK electricity supply industry
- List of power stations in England
- Neepsend power station
