= Sheffield-Simplex =

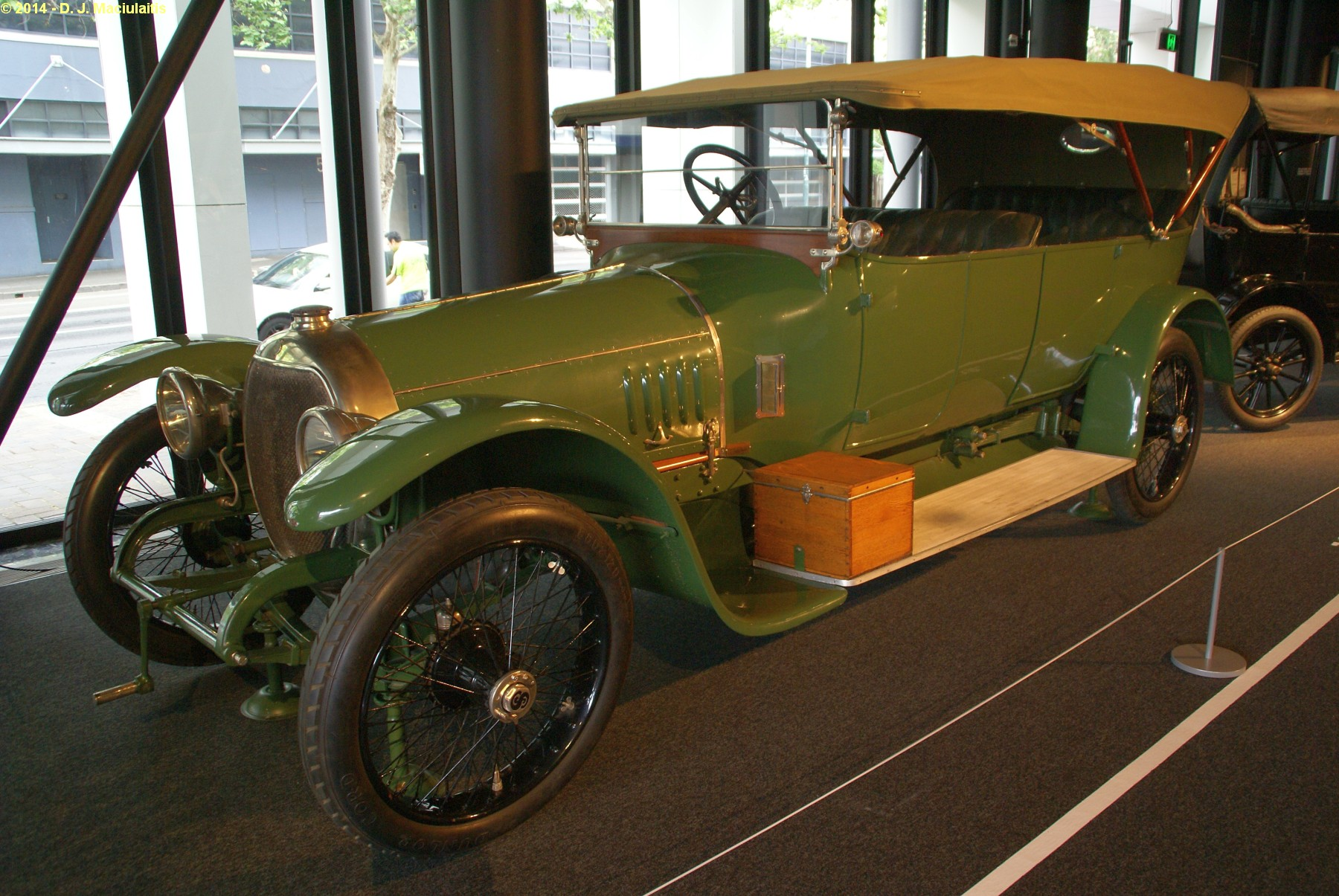
1913 LA7b 30hp open tourer

Sheffield-Simplex was a British car and motorcycle manufacturer operating from 1907 to 1920 based in Sheffield, Yorkshire, and Kingston upon Thames, Surrey.

The company received financial backing from aristocrat and coal magnate Earl Fitzwilliam. The first few cars were made by Peter Brotherhood and were a continuation of the Brotherhood-Crocker cars made in London in which Earl Fitzwilliam had been an investor. Stanley Brotherhood sold the London site in 1905 and moved his Peter Brotherhood business to Peterborough, near Fitzwilliam's second seat at Milton Park. He could not get permission to build a car factory in Peterborough so the Earl suggested a move to Sheffield where Stanley Brotherhood built a new factory in Tinsley a few miles south of Wentworth-Woodhouse, the Fitzwilliam family seat.

== History ==
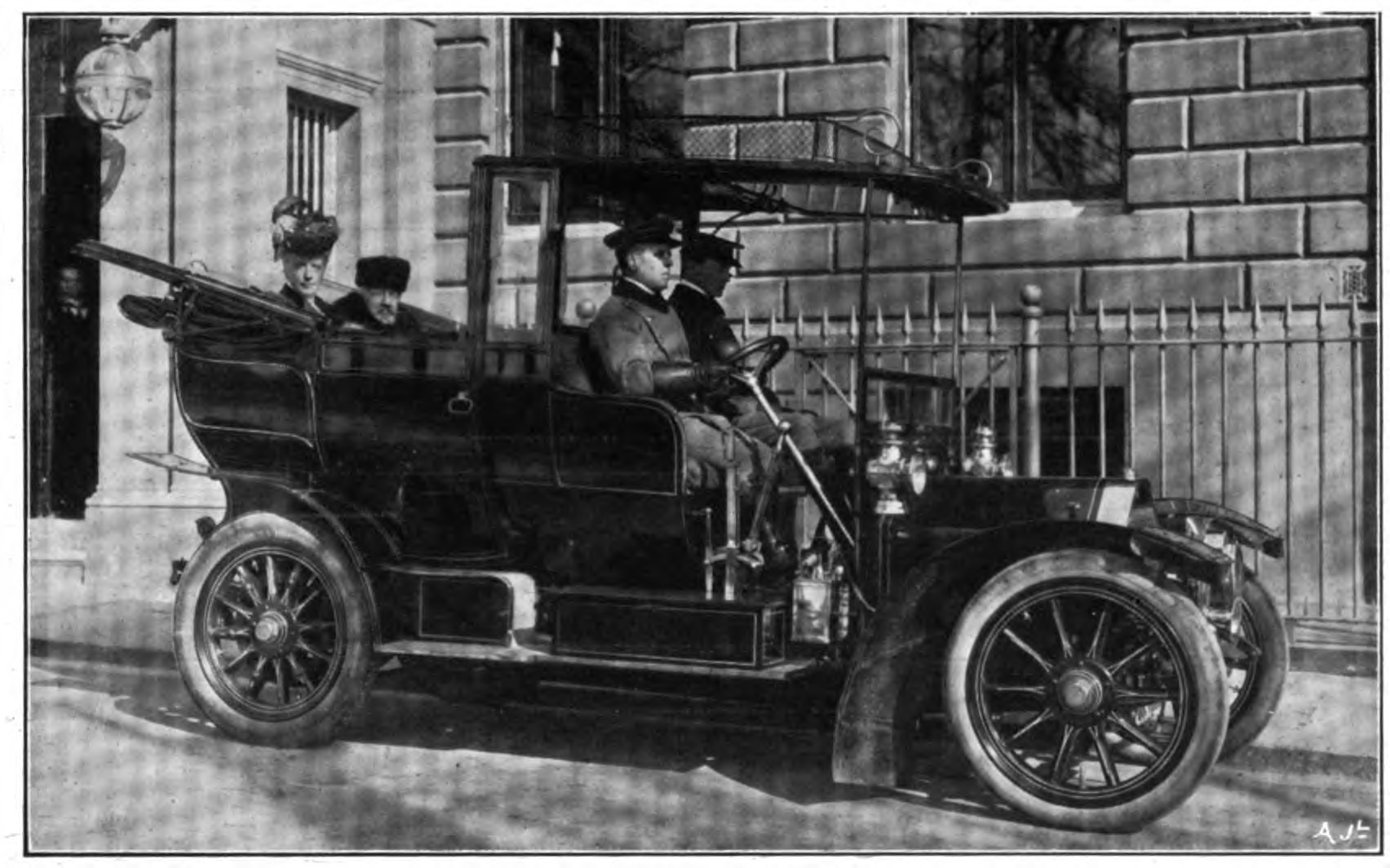
Brotherhood 20-25 landaulette 1905

In late 1906 Peter Brotherhood withdrew from the car venture and the former Brotherhood cars bore just the Sheffield-Simplex name. In 1908, the first proper Sheffield-Simplex cars appeared designed by managing director Percy Richardson, formerly of Daimler and Peter Brotherhood. The 45 hp LA1 had a six-cylinder 6978 cc engine and three-speed gearbox. It was joined in 1908 by the LA2, intended for lighter open bodies which did without a conventional gear system, having one forward gear and an emergency low and reverse gear in a small gearbox attached to the front of the differential housing. The only remaining example of a 45 hp LA2 is in private ownership and is seen frequently on rallies in Britain, Ireland and Belgium.

In November 1909 it was announced they had designed aero engines and were seriously considering their manufacture.

Four smaller cars joined the line up in November 1909. The 14-20 hp LA3 and long wheelbase LA4 were the babies of the family with a four-cylinder engine of 2882 cc, and Renault-style dashboard radiators, while the 20-30 hp LA5 and LA6 had six-cylinder 4324 cc power units. These cars lasted only one year and in 1911 were replaced by the 25 hp LA7 with a six-cylinder 4740 cc engine allowing the company to boast that only one other British maker made only six-cylinder cars. Sheffield-Simplex considered their only rival to be Rolls-Royce and even opened their London showroom very close by in Conduit Street.

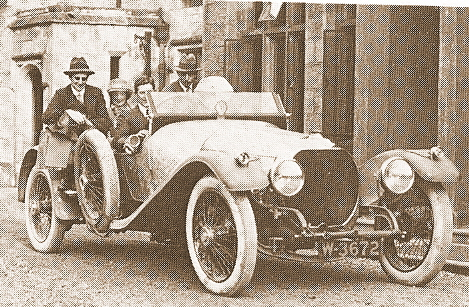
1914 Sheffield-Simplex LA7b 30 hp

In 1913 the Sheffield-Simplex was hailed by The Times as the "highest point to which motor design has yet attained".

The LA7 was updated to 30 hp LA7b specification in 1913 (RAC 29.47 hp) and this included electric starting. Warwick Wright was joint managing director. In 1914, the old 45 hp LA1 and 2 models were finally dropped.

During World War I, the company made armoured cars supplied to the Belgian and Russian armies, ABC Wasp and Dragonfly aircraft engines and munitions.

Car production recommenced in 1919 with the LA7b but now called the 30 hp. Few were sold and it was replaced by a new design, the 50, in 1920. This had a new engine of 7777 cc with each of its six cylinders cast separately. It appeared at the London Motor Show in 1921 fitted with a two-seat body and again in 1922. It is quite probable that it was the only one made.

It is believed that at least three cars survive. The unique 50 hp car produced in 1920 and exhibited at several motor shows was acquired by Earl Fitzwilliam, the financial backer of the business, in 1925 after the liquidation of the Sheffield company. This car can be viewed in the Kelham Island Museum in Sheffield from where it is taken to local shows from time to time.

The ex-Lord Riverdale car (which he drove from Land's End to John o' Groat's without changing from top gear) is in private ownership and also appears at shows in the Yorkshire/Derbyshire area. Another example is owned by the Powerhouse Museum in Sydney, Australia.

== Shefflex ==
The commercial motor correspondent of The Times reported in autumn 1922 that he had tried at the request of the makers, Sheffield-Simplex, their 25 hp twenty passenger Shefflex omnibus. The correspondent pointed out that with a commercial vehicle the smaller the vehicle's unladen weight the greater its carrying capacity. The Shefflex body, he said, seemed to be too heavy but the engine seemed well-balanced, quiet and responsive. A pair of rail-mounted Shefflex omnibuses was delivered to the West Sussex Railway in 1928.

== Motorcycles ==
As well as cars, the company built Ner-a Car motorcycles and in 1923 opened a factory in Kingston upon Thames in Surrey. This unconventional machine was designed by American Carl Neracher and had a very low chassis dropping down between the wheels. Production continued until 1927.

== See also ==
- List of car manufacturers of the United Kingdom
