= Peter Brotherhood =

English engineer

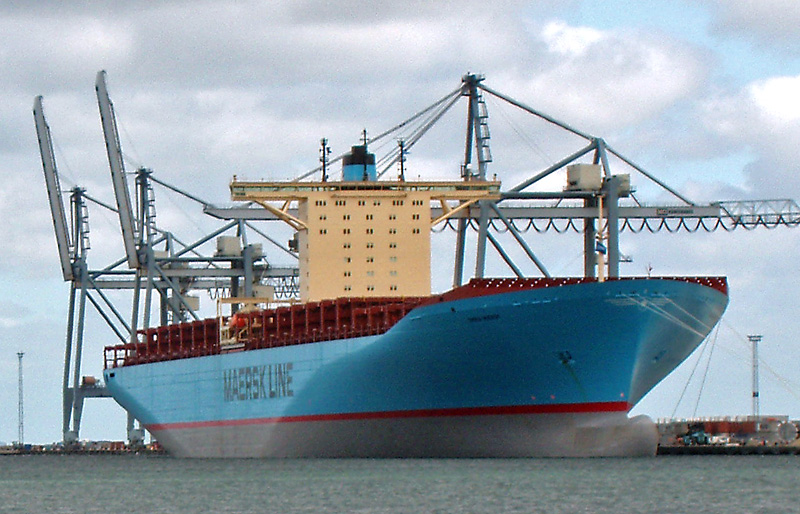
Container ship Emma Mærsk in Aarhus, September 5, 2006 fitted with Peter Brotherhood steam turbine and electrical generators

Peter Brotherhood (1838–1902) was an English engineer. He invented the Brotherhood engine used for torpedoes as well as many other engineering products.

With his son he built a large engineering business in London bearing his name, Peter Brotherhood. His son Stanley moved the works to Peterborough in 1903 where their engineering business continued to grow.

== Family of engineers ==
Brotherhood was the second son of the 14 children of Priscilla (née Penton) and Rowland Brotherhood (1812-1883), an English engineer. He was born in Maidenhead, Berkshire on 22 April 1838 and raised in comfortable circumstances in Chippenham, Wiltshire near his father's engineering works.

From the ages of 13 to 18, he studied applied science at King's College School. After practical experience including a period at the Great Western Railway's Swindon Works he joined the leading marine engineering works, Maudslay, Son & Field in Lambeth in their drawing-office.

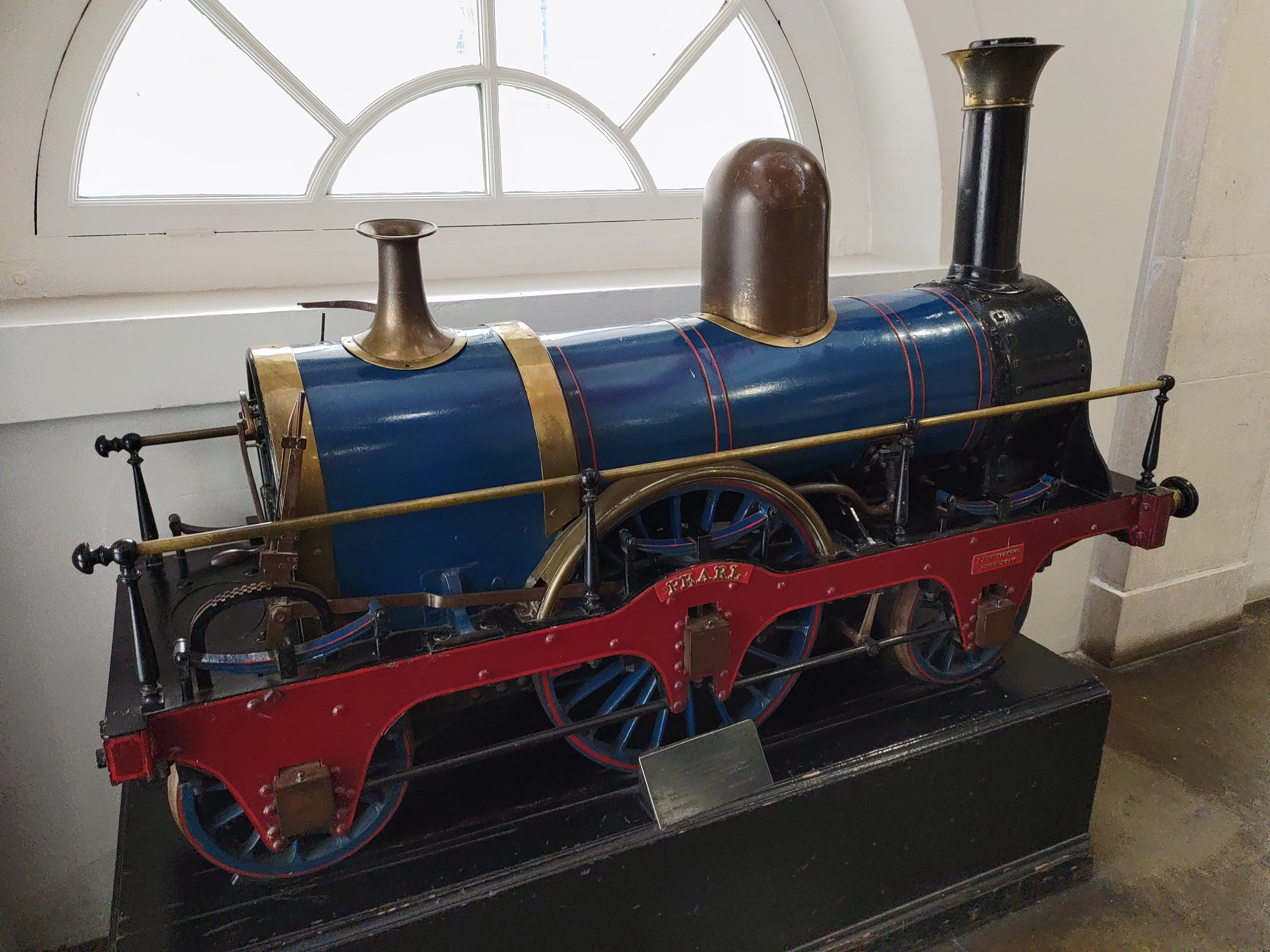
Pearl (1861) - 15-inch gauge model steam locomotive

In 1861 Brotherhood built the 15-inch gauge model steam locomotive 'Pearl' which is on display at the Strand Campus of King's College London and is understood to be the oldest large-scale model railway engine in existence.

He is said to have had a "mechanical instinct" which allowed him to design machinery without resorting to calculations or formulae. He also had a passion for experimentation.

On 19 April 1866, he married Eliza Pinniger Hunt, daughter of James Edward Hunt a contractor to the Indian Railways. Together they had five children, two daughters and three sons, two of his sons predeceased him.

Brotherhood died at his home 15 Hyde Park Gardens on 13 October 1902.

== Engineering firms ==
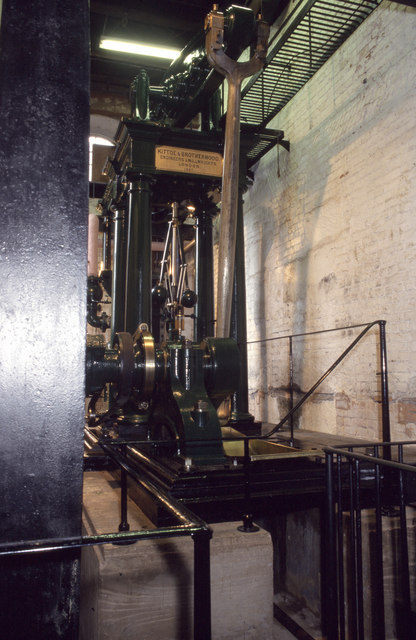
Coldharbour

=== Kittoe & Brotherhood ===
In 1867, before he had reached the age of 30, Brotherhood became a partner in the engineers and millwrights business of Kittoe and Brotherhood in Clerkenwell. At that time the firm's main product was brewing machinery. A restored Kittoe and Brotherhood beam engine of 1867 can be seen at the Coldharbour Mill museum in Devon - it was originally supplied to the Whitechapel Albion brewery.

Kittoe retired in 1871 and the firm became Peter Brotherhood.

=== Peter Brotherhood ===
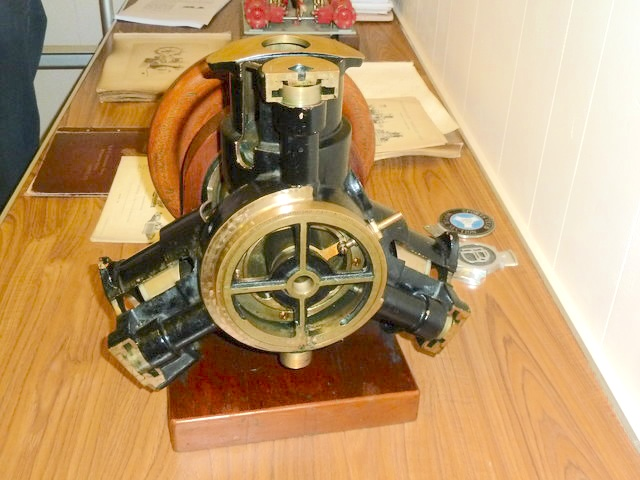
Cutaway of full-sized Brotherhood radial engine from a Whitehead torpedo

Brotherhood radial engine

After Kittoe's retirement the Peter Brotherhood firm mainly produced machines of Brotherhood's invention, in particular from 1872 the Brotherhood 3-cylinder 120 degrees radial engine which could be powered by steam, water or compressed air at high speed and in perfect balance. Put to many uses the Brotherhood engine drove the Royal Navy's Whitehead torpedoes and was used in the torpedoes of other navies as well. Fans, dynamos and other high speed machines were directly driven by this engine.

In 1881 the business moved to Belvedere Road, Lambeth.

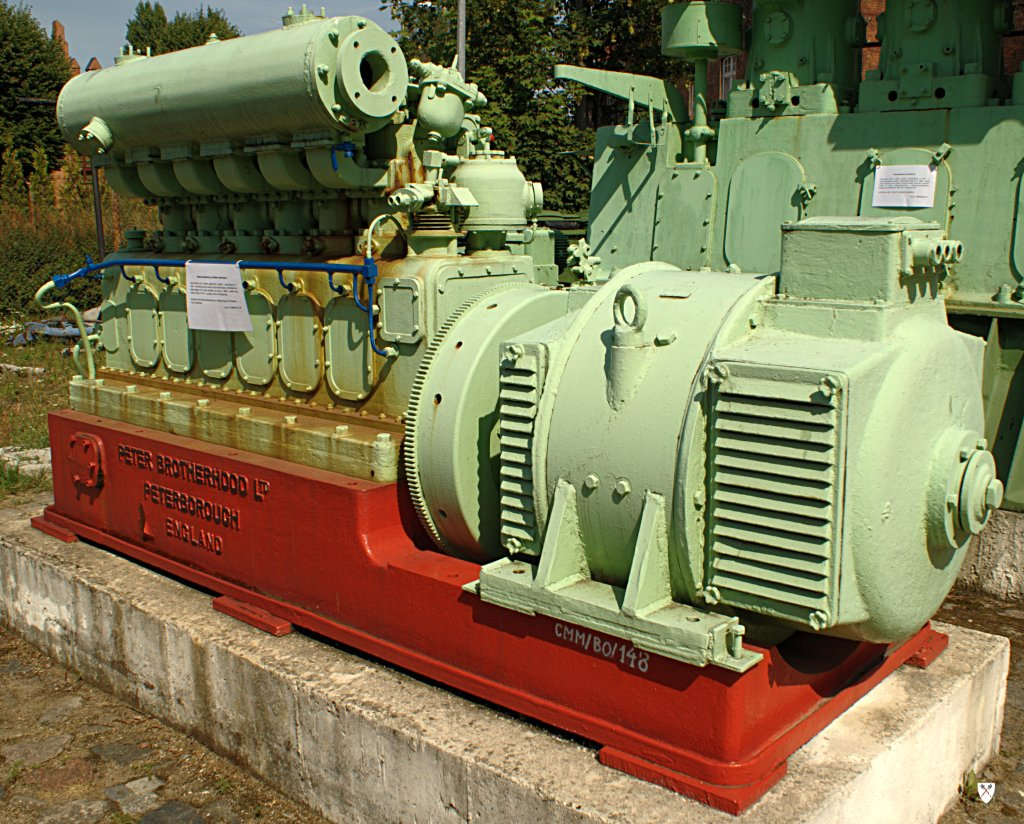
Generating set of MS Batory 1936

Products

The firm's production of the radial engine led not only to fans dynamos etc. but eventually to the manufacture of steam turbines, internal combustion engines and heavy oil and Diesel engines specially the Brotherhood-Ricardo high-speed heavy oil engine.

=== Stanley Brotherhood ===
In 1903 Brotherhood's only surviving son, Stanley (1880–1938), previously general manager for his father, moved the works from the Lambeth premises to Peterborough where it continues as Peter Brotherhood Limited.

=== Motor industry ===
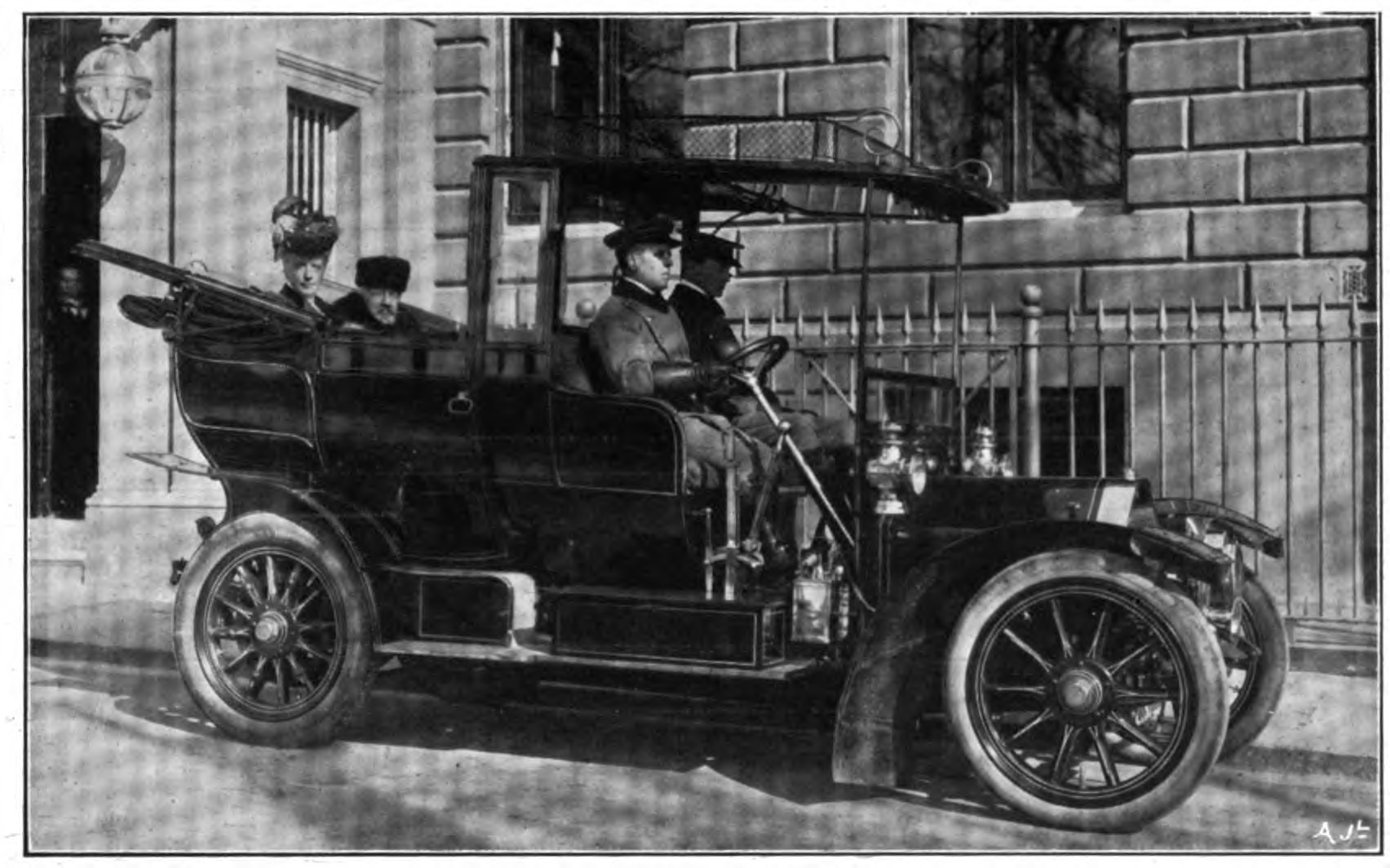
Brotherhood 20-25 landaulette 1905

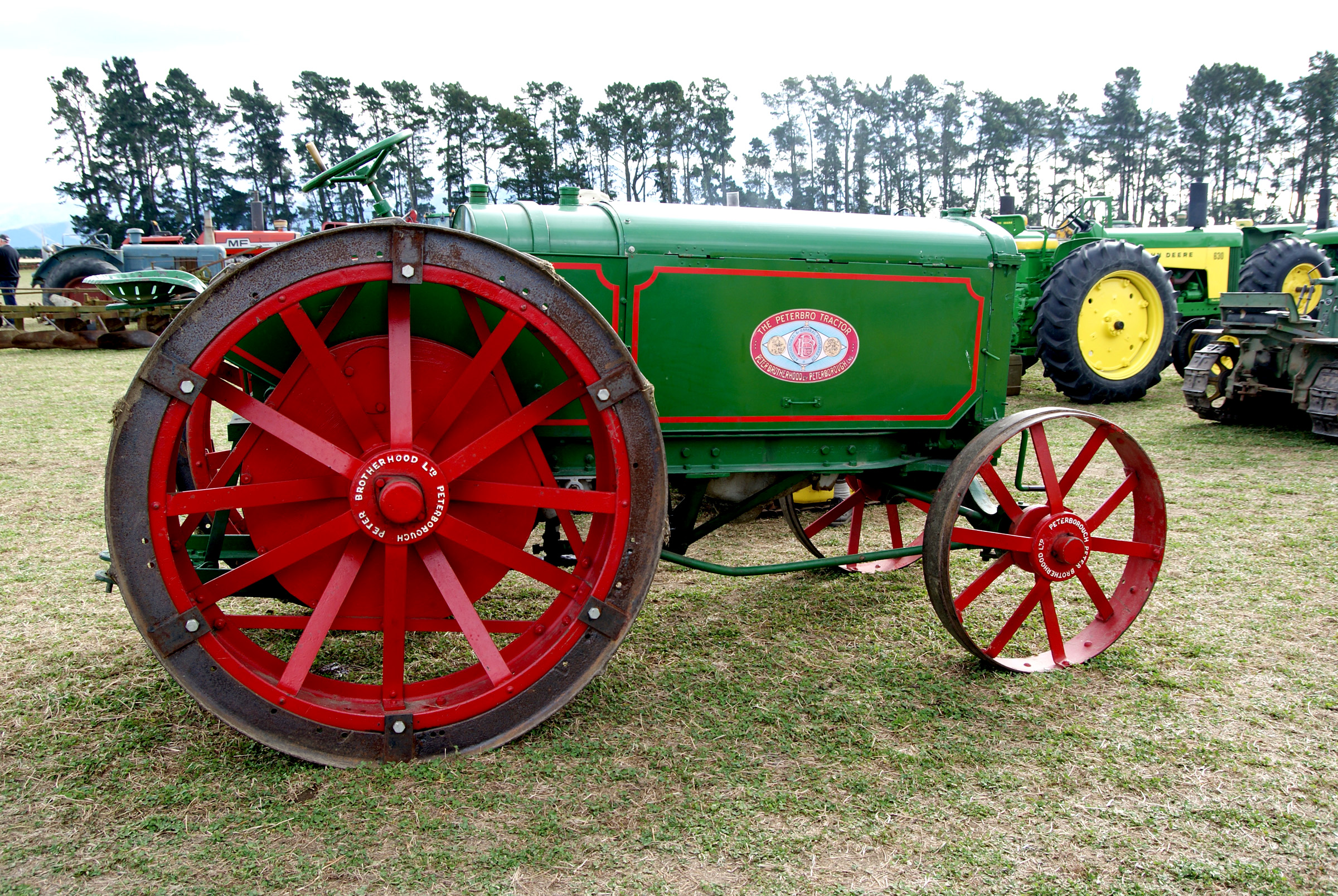
Peterbro tractor with a complicated but powerful paraffin engine designed by Ricardo

Peter Brotherhood Limited made cars in Lambeth then, unable to get consent for a car factory in Peterborough, moved their manufacture to Tinsley in Yorkshire before they withdrew from that venture in 1906. They continued to make heavy agricultural tractors. From late 1906 the cars were named Sheffield-Simplex. Brotherhood's backer Fitzwilliam of Milton near Peterborough and Wentworth Woodhouse near Tinsley took over the car business naming it for Sheffield the nearby town and the operational simplicity of his expensive cars.

Stanley Brotherhood was a director then chairman of Humber Limited until it merged with Hillman Motor Company and came under the control of the Rootes Group in 1929.

=== Peter Brotherhood Limited ===
On 16 December 1907, a private limited liability company was incorporated to own the Peter Brotherhood business. In 1920 it joined the engineering combine Agricultural & General Engineers or AGE however AGE sold its 70 per cent share of Peter Brotherhood in late 1930 before AGE collapsed in 1932. On 29 June 1937 Peter Brotherhood became a public company and was listed on the London Stock Exchange a few days later.

Products

In June 1937, Peter Brotherhood's products included: high and low pressure compressors, compressors for torpedo service, torpedo tubes, Brotherhood high speed forced lubrication steam engines, steam turbines, turbo-generators, high speed diesel engines, oil and gas engines, refrigerating compressors, pumps, water cooling towers, filtering plants, fans, dynamometers, pressure gauge testing and other precision instruments.

Before the company went public in 1937 contracts had been undertaken for more than 60 years for H M Government and numerous Dominion and foreign governments and many of the principal industrial, shipping, and utility enterprises in and beyond the United Kingdom including: London County Council, Metropolitan Water Board, Gas Light & Coke Company, Imperial Chemical Industries, Union Cold Storage, Burmah Oil, Anglo-Iranian Oil, London & North Eastern Railway, London, Midland & Scottish Railway and P&O.

In 2008, the business was sold to Dresser-Rand. On 30 October 2015 the Hayward Tyler Group completed the acquisition of the Peter Brotherhood business from Dresser-Rand.

Avingtrans Engineering Technology Group announced an all-share acquisition of the Hayward Tyler Group as of September 1, 2017 in which Hayward Tyler became a wholly owned division of Avingtrans. Peter Brotherhood, based in Peterborough, which sat within Avingtrans’ Process Solutions and Rotating Equipment (“PSRE”) division, specialises in the design, manufacture and servicing of performance-critical steam turbines, turbo gen-sets, compressors, gear boxes and combined heat and power systems. It was acquired in September 2017, as part of the acquisition of the Hayward Tyler Group.

On 11 March 2021, Howden acquired Peter Brotherhood from Avingtrans.
