= West Sussex Railway =

Railway line in West Sussex, England

The West Sussex Railway was an 8 1/4-mile (13.3 km) long standard gauge light railway between Chichester and Selsey, in West Sussex. The line, which opened in 1897, was also known as Hundred of Manhood and Selsey Tramway. It was opened as a rail tramway in order to avoid having to comply with regulations that managed conventional railways in the United Kingdom. The line was built under the auspices of the light railway entrepreneur, Colonel Stephens, who would later manage the line as the West Sussex Railway (Tramway Section).

In December 1910 the line was inundated (flooded by seawater) when an embankment failed at Pagham Harbour. It was not reinstated so work had to be carried out to raise the line above the waters. Although the line was successful in the decades before the First World War, it suffered financially as road transport increased in the 1920s. Despite attempts to be more efficient through modernisations, such as the introduction of petroleum driven rail car services, the railway closed to all traffic in January 1935. Very little remains of the railway's infrastructure because of land redevelopment and urban expansion along its permanent way.

== Origins ==
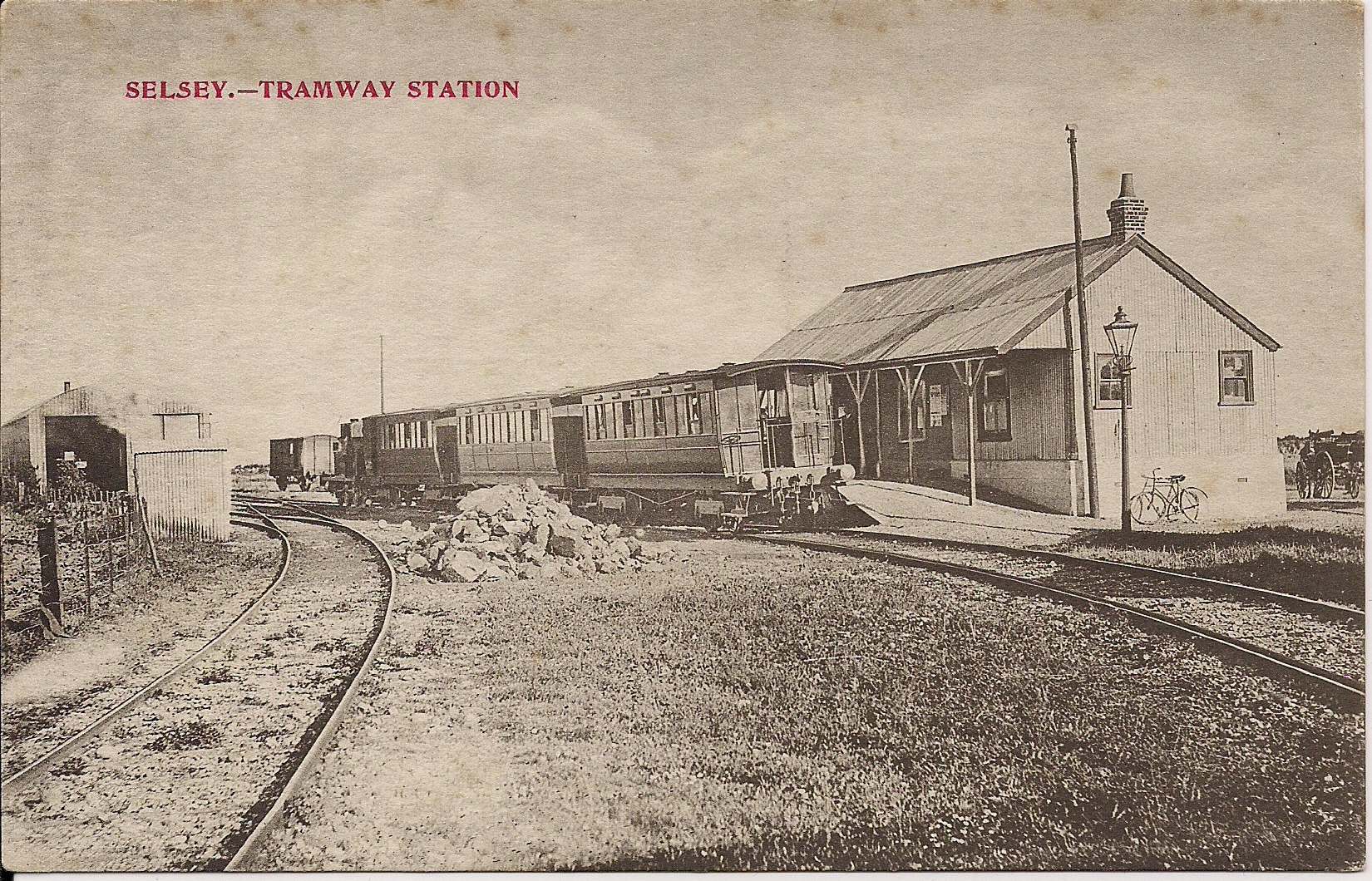
Selsey Tramway Station

The passing of the Light Railways Act 1896 (59 & 60 Vict. c. 48) prompted local businessmen to consider whether a light railway connection to Selsey could be made. The town lies on the coast about 8 miles (13 km) south of the City of Chichester. As they prepared their scheme, they found that it would be possible to get authorisation much more simply under the Railway Construction Facilities Act 1864 (27 & 28 Vict. c. 121). By structuring the line as a tramway, the numerous public road level crossings would not require the special safety arrangements required for railway operation, and accordingly they formed the Hundred of Manhood and Selsey Tramway. The company was incorporated on 29 April 1896.

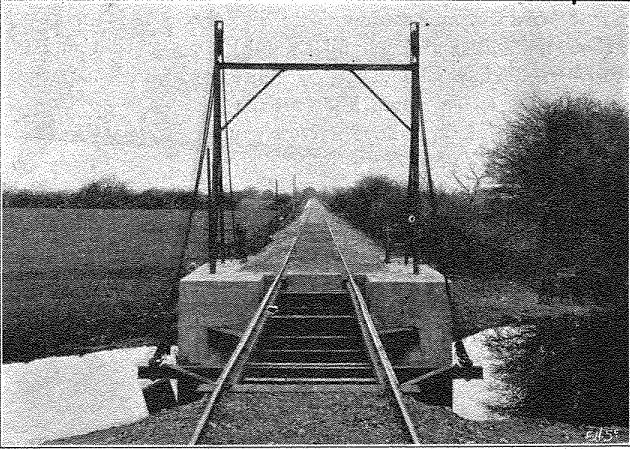
Lift bridge at crossing of the Chichester Canal

H. F. Stephens was appointed as engineer to design the line and supervise construction;this was his second such role, after the Rye and Camber Tramway. His subsequent career pursued several very local lines often run on minimal finance; during war service he became (Lieutenant-) Colonel Stephens, by which he is better known.

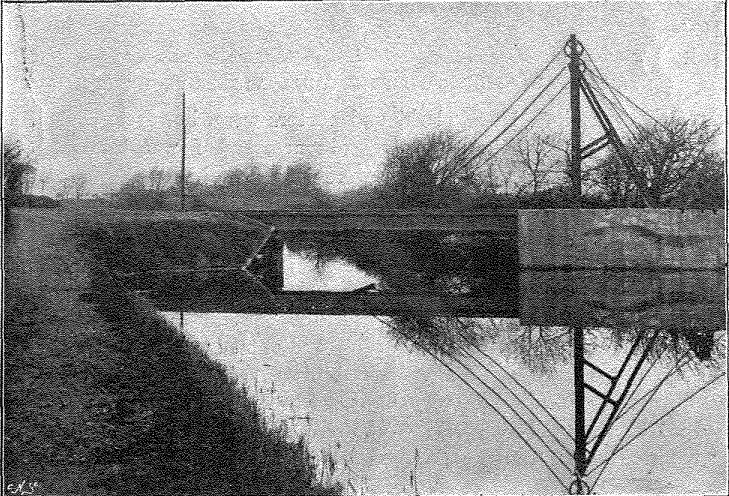
Lift bridge over Chichester Canal, 1897

The land was acquired from co-operative landowners without the need for compulsory powers, although this forced a slightly indirect route. It started from a point a little to the south of the London, Brighton and South Coast Railway (LB&SCR) station at Chichester; it left westwards and immediately turned south, running broadly southwards to Selsey itself, a distance of 8 1/4 miles (13.3 km). Just south of Chichester, the line crossed the Chichester Canal, which still had some small traffic volume passing, and a simple manually operated lifting bridge was provided there.

The contractor for the construction needed a locomotive for the work, and the locomotive was moved on the public road to get to the line south of the Chichester Canal. It was hauled by a traction engine, and it ran on rails placed on their sides in the roadway; workmen progressively moved the rails to the front of the engine as it made its slow movement. The locomotive was later named Chichester.

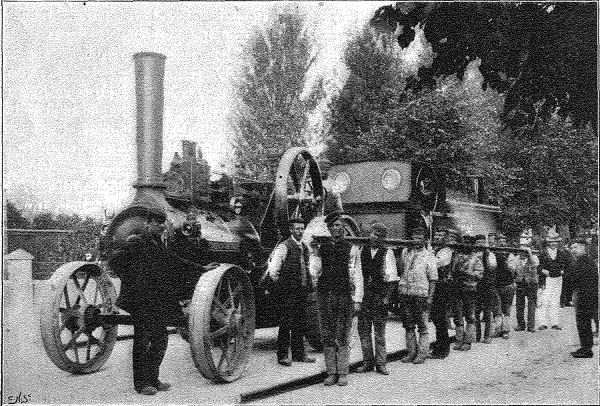
Whitechurch's 1897 photograph of the road transfer of the locomotive

Whitechurch describes the event; referring to the Chichester and Birdham Canal (i.e. the Chichester Canal), he says:

I am able to supply a unique photograph of an incident that happened during the construction of the line owing to this canal. The engine had been brought down to Chichester and was much wanted on the other side of the canal, but as the bridge was not completed for traffic it was impossible to cross. The little locomotive, therefore, had to perform a slow and circuitous journey by road of over 3 miles (4.8 km), being hauled by a traction engine on rails, simply placed down on the road in front of the railway engine and taken up from behind it alternately.

The line was built to standard gauge, 4 ft 8 1/2 in (1,435 mm), with Vignoles (flat-bottom) rails spiked to light transverse sleepers, "the whole of the line being ballasted with gravel, and, if I mistake not, a goodly bulk of sea shingle mixed therewith".

The line opened to Selsey Town station on 27 August 1897 and it was extended to Selsey Beach in 1898. The construction and land purchase had cost £21,570 and rolling stock had cost £3,268.

== Operation ==
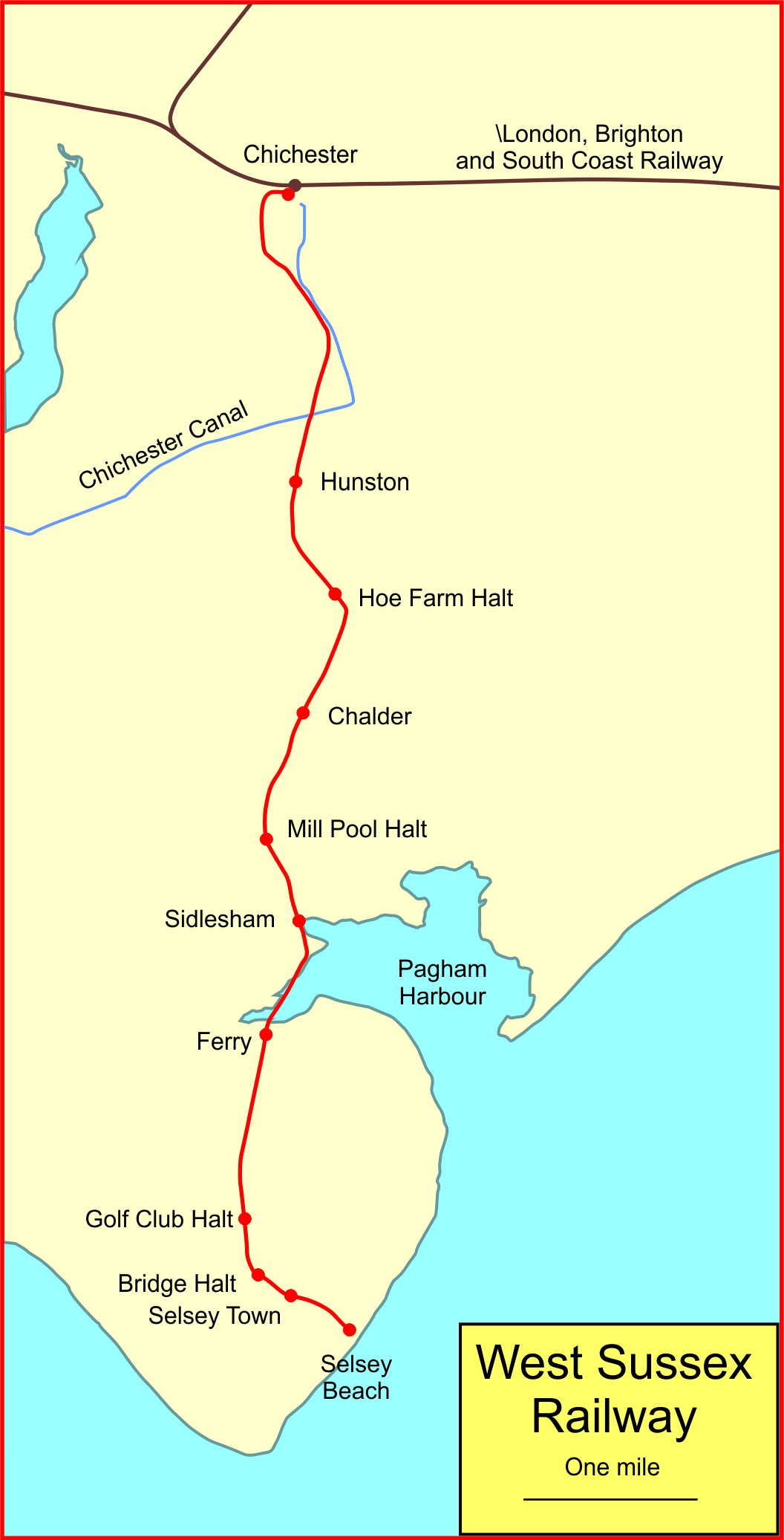
Map of West Sussex Railway

The first passenger coaches were newly built bogie vehicles with open verandas at the end; one was built by Hurst Nelson, and three by Falcon of Loughborough. About 1900 another new coach of similar design was acquired from Hurst Nelson.

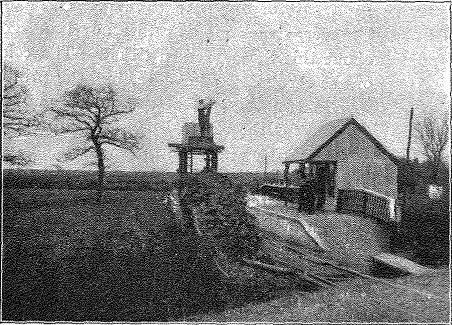
Hunston station in 1897; note the boy on the engine-water tower, waiting to operate it

The stations on the line were:

- Chichester; the station was a short distance south of the LB&SCR station
- Hunston, where there was a level crossing and a short siding; there was also a brickworks with an independent loop siding north of the station for some years;
- Hoe Farm [Halt]; this was a private halt for the farm owner;
- Chalder; the access was over a private farm road, and the Company paid the landowner £2 per annum for the wayleave;
- Mill Pond Halt;this was the closest station to Sidlesham village; opened 15 October 1910 and closed May 1911; reopened 9 July 1928;
- Sidlesham; the station name seems to have been spelt Siddlesham at first; this was a variant spelling of the village name, although the 1880 Ordnance Survey Map uses the modern spelling; the station was some distance south of the village. Suffering from the 1910 inundation, the station was closed from 15 December 1910 until June 1911; the track level was raised by about four feet (1.2 m) at the station level crossing; there was a loop siding here;
- Ferry; Butt names this Ferry Siding Halt; Cobb says Ferry Siding at first and renamed Ferry in 1911;
- Golf Club Halt; this was private
- Selsey Bridge; the main road crossed the line here, the only road bridge on the line; there was a short siding and, some time after 1911 a brick works had a private siding;
- Selsey Town; renamed Selsey from 1911; the engine shed was located here, with a goods siding and run-round loop;
- Selsey Beach; opened 1 August 1898 and closed October 1904; the train service may have operated in summer only; there was a simple run-round loop and single platform.

In 1910 there were seven trains each way on weekdays (one extra on Mondays) and three on Sundays. Journey time for the 7 1/4 miles (11.7 km) was 30 minutes.

Whitechurch gave a description of a trip on the line in 1897:

One car stood by the little platform, ready to start. ... This was a third class car. A first class stood in a siding. ... Another car of which I caught a glimpse at Selsey completes, I believe, the "passenger rolling stock" of the little railway. ... The Company own two engines, the "Selsey" and the "Chichester", the former for "passenger" and the latter, a "six-wheels coupled" for "goods" traffic. The "Selsey", a trim-looking little side-tank locomotive, is painted dark blue with a red lining ... The boiler is surmounted with a handsome brass dome on which are two spring balances [for the safety valves], while a neat copper ring is an adornment to the chimney.

Before we got away on the journey, a very remarkable operation in shunting had to be performed, albeit it was commenced two minutes after the time for starting. Two trucks were brought in from a siding, and so manipulated with engine and by hand, that finally one was attached in rear of the car, and the other in front of the locomotive!

[Later we came] to Hunston Station, a tiny iron building with a little platform, but a most important point of the line, in that it is the coaling and water depôt, and supplies of both were taken in by the engine, the train backing to allow this to be done, so that our car stood right across the main road during the operation. ... Chalder, another little station was reached at 10.58. We left our rear truck in the siding here ... [At Siddlesham] we performed some marvellous shunting operations, which occupied six minutes, and which resulted in our entering on the last stage of our journey, with three trucks in front of the engine and two behind our carriage—the very best example of a mixed train it has ever been my fortune to behold! ... Just before reaching Selsey we passed through the only cutting and under the only road-bridge the line possesses, pausing a few minutes to get rid of our five trucks at a siding.

About midway on the journey home, I, who was seated in the front compartment of the car, saw a red flag being violently waved a few hundred yards ahead. ... as the train slowed down, the individual in question, a stalwart, gaitered farmer, removed the danger signal from his stick, and calmly came aboard the car, doubtless thanking his lucky stars for the little railway that ran within a few feet of the garden of his house.

There were no signals on the line; the train control system was train staff and ticket with two sections, broken at Sidlesham.

== Inundation of 1910 ==
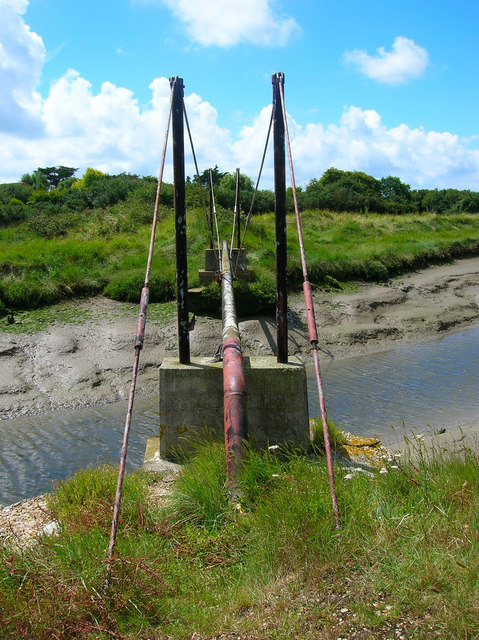
Bridge over channel at Ferry

A fierce and prolonged storm took place in December 1910, culminating in a breach of the sea wall during the night of 15 December. 2,000 acres (810 hectares) of land were flooded, including the railway line north of Ferry. Part of the line was said to be under 12 feet of water.

During the inundation, trains ran from each end of the line, and a horse-drawn omnibus operated in the gap, from Mill Pond Halt to Ferry station. At this time the company was relatively prosperous, and had the resources to raise the line by up to ten feet (3.0 m) over a considerable length.

== After 1919 ==
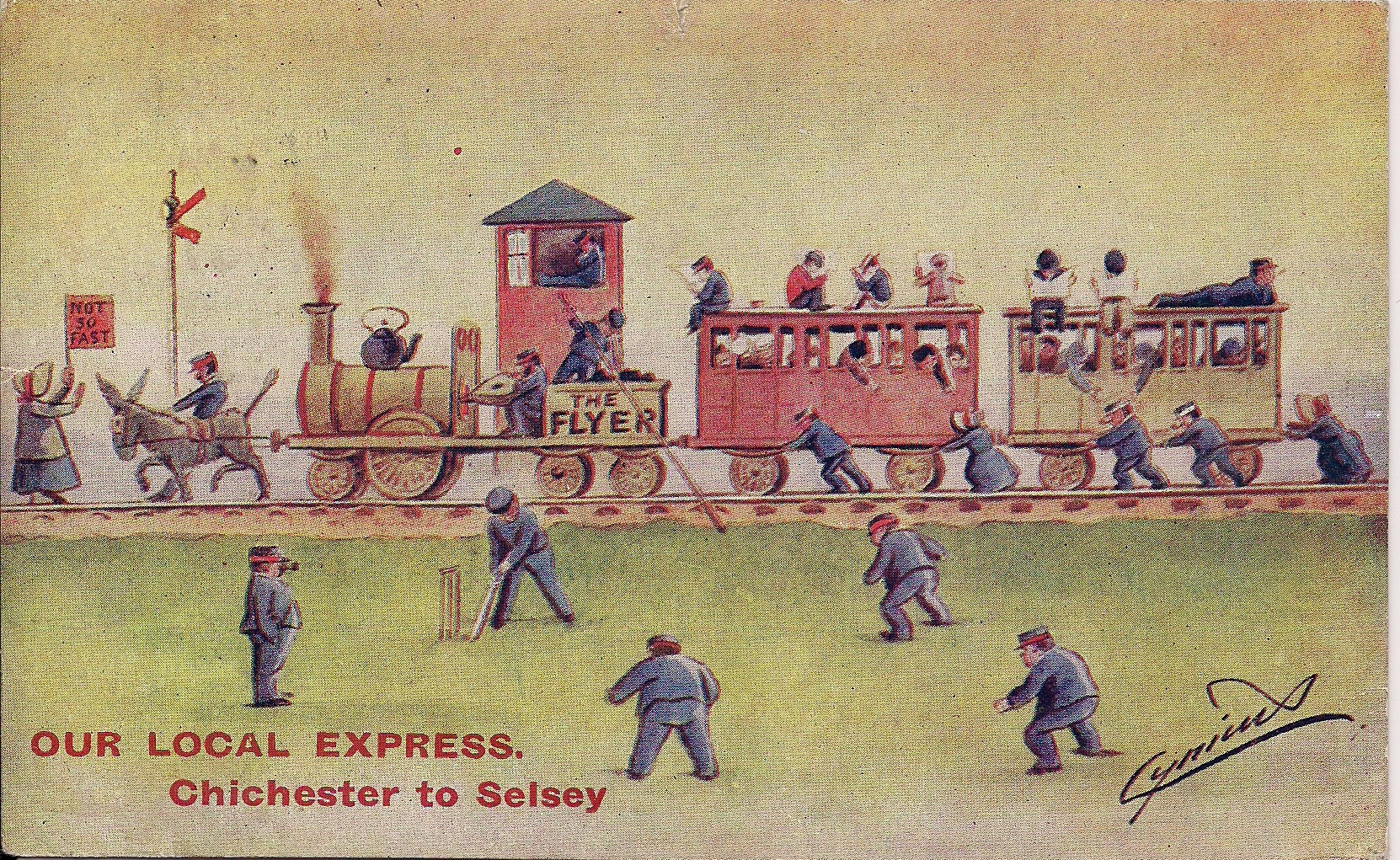
Picture postcard depicting the train

Following the end of the First World War, independent operators of road lorries, and, gradually, road passenger vehicles, became numerous, and the inconvenience of using the tramway became prominent: agricultural produce and supplies needed to be carted to and from the tramway station, and the thinly distributed population were more easily serviced by a road vehicle, especially when that could run to the centre of Chichester or direct to the LB&SCR station there. Traffic declined seriously in the 1920s.

In 1924 the company changed its name to West Sussex Railway (Tramway Section) in 1924. Mitchell and Smith suggest that this was a preliminary to securing a takeover by the Southern Railway, the successor to the LB&SCR. The Southern Railway considered the matter but declined to proceed. Southdown Motor Services had been formed in 1915 and was running timetabled bus services locally, and increasingly passengers preferred to take the bus—at a higher fare—and passenger receipts declined further.

Year	Passengers	Receipts
1919	102,292	£3,912
1924	31,352	£949
1929	22,676	£557
1933	21,088	£427

During this period freight traffic remained relatively steady at about £2,000 a year.

== Steam locomotives ==
The following steam locomotives were used on the line:

Name	Number	Builder	Date built	Wheel arrangement	Driving wheels	Cylinders	Boiler pressure	Notes
Selsey	2	Peckett and Sons	1897	2-4-2T	2 ft 9in	10" x 15"	140 psi	New
Sidlesham	3 or 2	Manning Wardle	1861	0-6-0ST	3 ft 2in	11" x 17"	120 psi	Ex-industrial
Hesperus	4 or 2	Neilson and Company	1871 or 1872	0-4-2ST	3 ft 1in	10" x 18"	90 psi	Ex-PDSWJR
Ringing Rock	5 or 2	Manning Wardle	1883	0-6-0ST	3 ft 2in	12" x 17"	120 psi	Ex-industrial
Chichester (first)	1 or 3	Dodds of Rotherham	c 1865	0-4-2ST	3 ft 6in	11" x 18"	120 psi	Built as 0-6-0ST
Chichester (second)	6 or 4	Hudswell Clarke	1903	0-6-0ST	3 ft 1in	12" x 18"	120 psi	Ex-industrial
Morous	7 or 4	Manning Wardle	1866	0-6-0ST	3 ft 2in	11" x 17"	120 psi	Ex-SMR

Sources for the above table include Kidner Woodcock and Mitchell and Smith.

Some sources state that the first Chichester was built by the Longbottom Railway Foundry in Barnsley about 1847.

Hesperus had come from the Plymouth, Devonport and South Western Junction Railway and was originally 3 ft 6 in gauge.

The second Chichester arrived with the name Wembley having worked there previously, and the engine continued to be known by that name for some time.

Ringing Rock was so named because Stephens transferred the name plate from a locomotive on the Kent and East Sussex Railway that had previously worked on the Narberth Road and Maenclochog Railway; Ringing Rock is the English translation of Maenclochog.

== Railcars ==
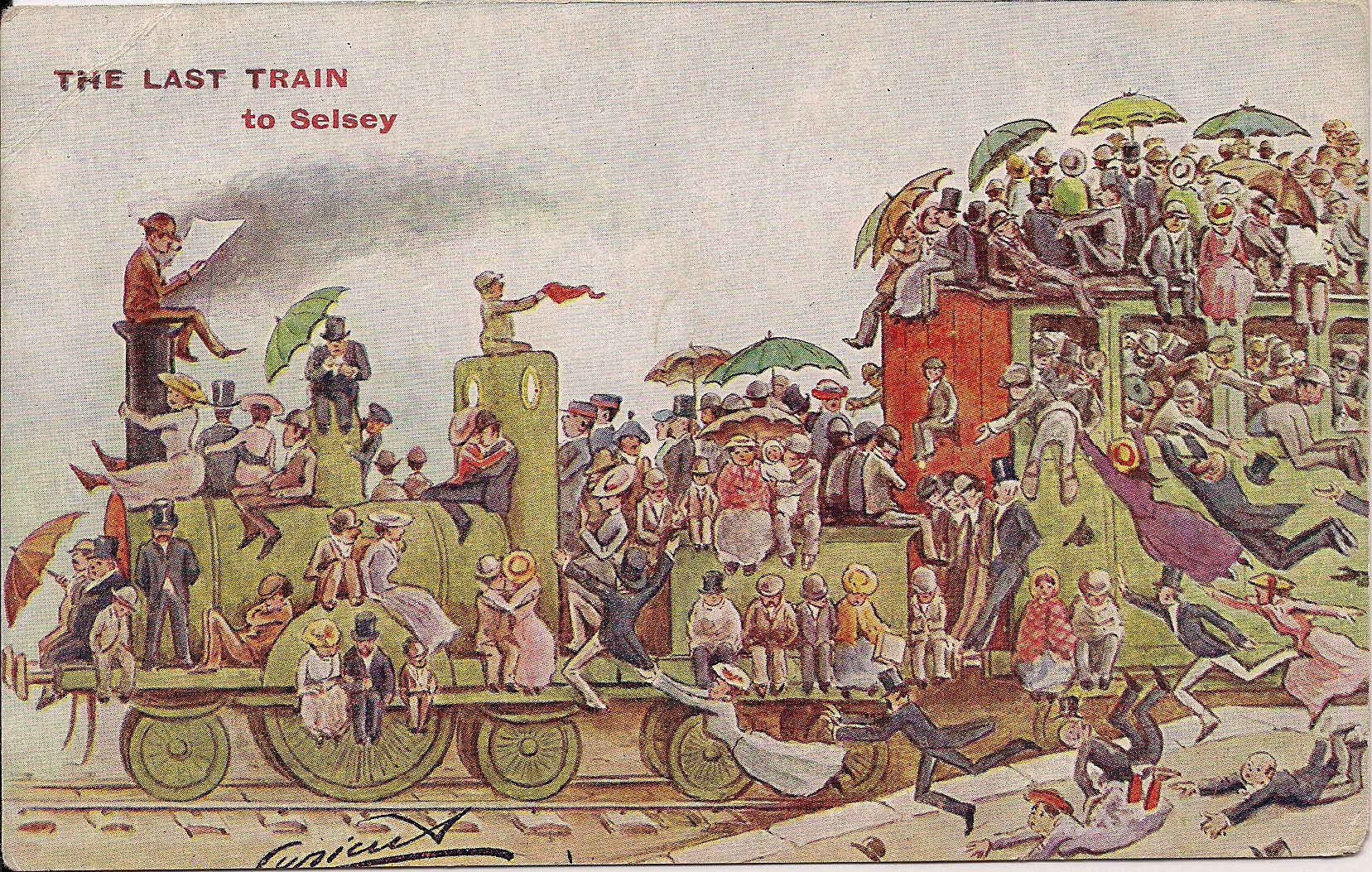
Picture postcard depicting the train

In 1921, Stephens was seeking means of reducing operating expenses, and a trial was made of a Wolseley-Siddeley petrol railcar on the line; this did not immediately lead to adoption, but in 1924, acquired two railcars built on Ford Model T chassis, with bodies by Edmunds of Thetford. They operated together, back-to-back with a truck for luggage and parcels between them; they had rails on the roof to contain additional parcels stowed there.

The Steam and Things model making company has good original photographs of the cars at .

Two more railcars were acquired from the Shefflex Motor Company of Tinsley in 1928; they too operated as a unit with a truck between. The railcars were provided with a crude timber buffer beam in front of the radiator, as protection.

== Coaching stock ==
The initial coaching stock fleet consisted of three bogie saloon coaches from Falcons, acquired in 1897. A similar coach was purchased from Hurst Nelson about 1900.

In 1910 three four-wheel coaches were acquired from the Lambourn Valley Railway.

In 1916 a further four four-wheelers were obtained second hand from the London, Chatham and Dover Railway (LC&DR).

Finally, in 1931 two six-wheel coaches were acquired from the Southern Railway, probably for summer Saturdays when the railcars would be inadequate; they had been built for the LC&DR.

Between the World Wars a number of life-expired main line railway coaches were acquired by private individuals for the purpose of converting them to dwellings on the shore at Selsey. In many cases these vehicles made their final railway journey over the West Sussex Railway to Selsey. A few of these remain in situ, often as part of enlarged buildings, but most have been replaced. There remains one recognisable wooden-bodied Pullman car.

== Closure ==
The 1/2 mile (0.80 km) of track from Selsey Town to Selsey Beach was out of use by the end of 1908. (Butt says October 1904.)

The line was closed in January 1935.

== Archaeology ==
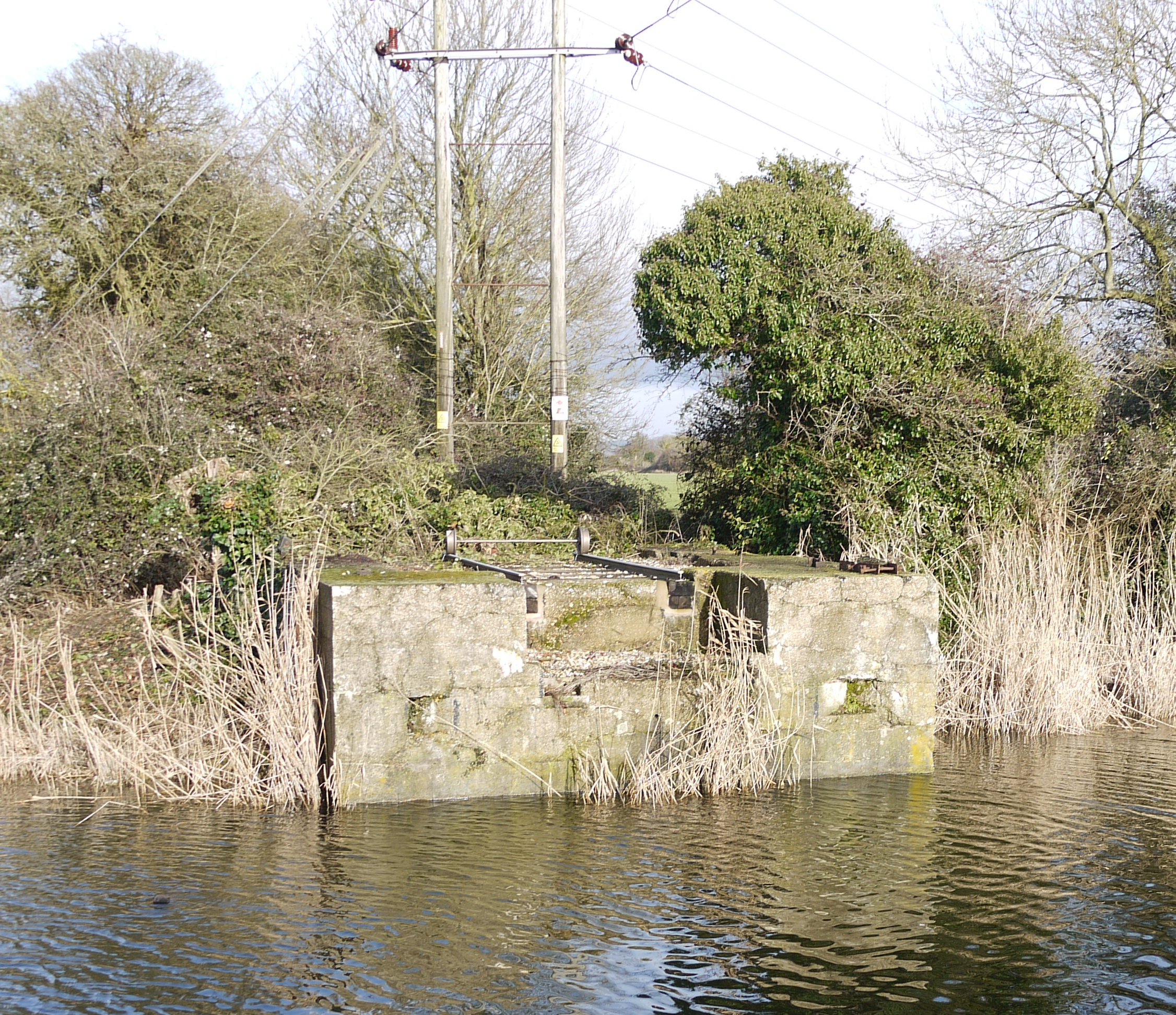
The remains of where the railway crossed the Chichester canal

For the modern railway explorer this is one of the least rewarding lines to trace as the formation was almost completely at ground level, and almost nothing remains except a 1/2 mile (0.80 km) section alongside Pagham harbour where the track was raised following the inundation of 1910. A section of about a 1/4 mile (0.40 km), now a farm track between Pagham Harbour and the Selsey Golf Club and a 1/4 mile (0.40 km) section (now a public footpath) west of Hunston Village can be traced. The northern end of the latter ends at the abutments of the now defunct Tramway Bridge across the Chichester Canal. A short section of trackbed is now a footpath from north of the Chichester Canal to Stockbridge Road, Chichester. The platforms of Hunston and Chalder station can also still be located in fields although badly overgrown.

== Failed proposals ==
In 1913 the directors proposed a light railway extension from Hunston to West Itchenor and East Wittering. However, the First World War put paid to the idea.

This line was surveyed by the builders of the Romney, Hythe and Dymchurch Railway in the early 1920s when they were looking for somewhere to build their miniature line which now runs in Kent. Apparently, despite being otherwise ideal for their purposes, the line was discounted because of the number of road crossings which would have been prohibitively expensive to either gate or bridge. The Southern Railway also surveyed it for takeover and improvement in the early 1930s but decided against both.

== Local colour ==
It was known locally as the Selsey Tram. It was also sometimes called "The Siddlesham Snail" after one of the villages having a station of that name. Sidlesham station's nameboard originally perpetuated the old spelling "Siddlesham". A song was written criticising the line which verse went

"The Siddlesham snail,
the Siddlesham snail,
the boilers burst,
she's off the rail,
the Siddlesham snail!"

== Accidents ==
On 3 September 1923, the 8:15 a.m. train to Chichester derailed near Golf Club Halt, killing the fireman, H. Barnes, and injuring the driver, C. C. Stewart. None of the few passengers were injured. The locomotive, Wembley and the three coaches left the track. The inquest returned a verdict of accidental death, but the jury expressed the opinion that the Chief Engineer of the company was indirectly to blame, as there was evidence of neglect in the upkeep of the track.
