= Neepsend power station =

Former power station in England

- Country: England
- Location: Sheffield, South Yorkshire
- Coordinates: 53°24′19″N 01°29′08″W
- Status: Decommissioned and Demolished
- Construction began: 1909
- Commission date: 1910
- Decommission date: 1976
- Construction cost: £250,000 (1914)
- Owners: Sheffield Corporation (1910–1948); British Electricity Authority (1948–1955); Central Electricity Authority (1955–1957); Central Electricity Generating Board (1958–1976)
- Operator: As owner

Thermal power station
- Primary fuel: Coal
- Turbine technology: Steam turbines
- Chimneys: multiple
- Cooling source: Cooling towers

Power generation
- Units operational: 2 x 30 MW, 2 x 50 MW
- Make and model: British Thomson-Houston, Metropolitan Vickers
- Nameplate capacity: 160 MW
- Annual net output: 593,320 MWh (1954)

Neepsend power station supplied electricity to the City of Sheffield and the surrounding area from 1910 to 1976. The power station was owned and operated by the Sheffield Corporation Electricity Department prior to the nationalisation of the British electricity supply industry in 1948. It was operated in conjunction with Blackburn Meadows and Kelham power stations and was closed in 1976.

== History ==
Electricity in Sheffield had been fulfilled in 1892 by the formation of the Sheffield Electric Light & Co from a plant in Sheaf Street. In 1898 Sheffield Corporation acquired the undertaking. Sheaf Street wasn't a suitable site for further extensions so in 1901 the site for Neepsend power station was acquired. Located at Owlerton (53°24′19″N 1°29′08″W). between the River Don and the Great Central Railway which provided water for cooling and access from the railway for the supply of coal. On June 4th, 1904, the first section of the Neepsend Station containing two Parsons 1500-kW, two-phase, 50 Hz 2000 Volt generating sets. In 1910 the capacity of the station was increased by the addition of a further two Parsons sets of 2,000-kW each Then two Willans & Robinson turbines with Dick Kerr alternators were added of 4,500 kW and 6,000 kW. Then a further set from same supplier of 8,000 kW was added in 1914. By 1923 the station had a generating capacity of 65,000 kW. The station operated in conjunction with Blackburn Meadows (28,000 kW in 1923) and Kelham (5,500 kW in 1923) power stations, the latter provided electric current for the tram system. During the 1920s and 1930s there was only slow growth in electricity demand until the rearmament boom in the late 1930s when Neepsend and Blackburn Meadows power stations had further generating plant installed.

The British electricity supply industry was nationalised in 1948 under the provisions of the Electricity Act 1947 (10 & 11 Geo. 6. c. 54). The Sheffield electricity undertaking was abolished, ownership of Neepsend power station was vested in the British Electricity Authority, and subsequently the Central Electricity Authority and the Central Electricity Generating Board (CEGB). At the same time the electricity distribution and sales responsibilities of the Sheffield electricity undertaking were transferred to the Yorkshire Electricity Board (YEB).

Further new generating plant was installed at Neepsend in 1948–50.

Neepsend power station was closed on 25 October 1976.

== Equipment specification ==
=== Plant in 1914 ===
The plant installed in 1914 included a 10,500 kW Willans and Robinson steam turbine and Diek Kerr alternator. The boilers were Stirling water-tube type each capable of evaporating 4,800 gallons an hour (21.8 m^{3}/h). There were two cooling towers each cooled 330,000 gallons an hour (1500 m^{3}/h). In 1915 a 8,500 kW turbo alternator was commissioned followed by a further sized unit in 1916. The station was running under excessive load due to war time demands and the Ministry of Munitions commandeered a 2,000 kW set destined for a Russian colliery and a 9,000 kW set for a South American railway.

Plant in 1919

Set 1& 2 Parsons 2,000 kW 2 phase

Set 3 Willans Dick Kerr 4,500 kW

Set 4 Willans Dick Kerr 6,000 kW

Set 5&6 Willans Dick Kerr 8,500 kW

Set 6A Westinghouse-Rateau 2,000 kW

Set 7&8 Parsons 8,500 kW

Set 9 Westinghouse turbine driving 2 x 4,5000 kW Siemens alternators

These machines gave a total generating capacity of 59,500 kW alternating current (AC).

=== Plant in 1923 ===
By 1923 the plant comprised boilers delivering 1,240,000 lb/h (156.2 kg/s) of steam to:

3 × 2,000 kW steam turbo-alternators, alternating current (AC)

1 × 6,000 kW steam turbo-alternator AC

4 × 8,500 kW steam turbo-alternators AC

1 × 9,000 kW steam turbo-alternators AC

1 × 10,000 kW steam turbo-alternators AC

These machines gave a total generating capacity of 65,000 kW alternating current (AC).

=== Plant in 1954 ===
By 1954 the plant comprised:

- Boilers:
  - 5 × Stirling 160,000 lb/h (20.16 kg/s) tri-drum boilers
  - 3 × Stirling 190,000 lb/h (23.9 kg/s) tri-drum boilers
  - 3 × Mitchell 190,000 lb/h (23.9 kg/s) boiler

Steam conditions were 625 psi and 850°F (43.1 bar and 454°C).

There was a total steam raising capability of 835,000 lb/h (105.2 kg/s); steam was supplied to:

- Generators:
  - 2 × 30 MW British Thomson-Houston turbo-alternators, 3,000 rpm, 11.4 kV (installed 1936 and 1937)
  - 2 × 50 MW Metropolitan Vickers two cylinder turbo-alternator, 1,500 rpm, 11.4 kV (installed 1948 and 1950)

The total generating capacity from 1950 was 160 MW at 11.4 kV.

There were three Mitchell cooling towers, each with a capacity of 10.5 million gallons per hour (13.26 m^{3}/s).

== Operating data ==
Operating data for the period 1946–72 was:

Neepsend power station operating data, 1946–72
| Year | Running hours | Load factor, percent | Max output capacity, MW | Electricity supplied, MWh | Thermal efficiency, per cent |
|---|---|---|---|---|---|
| 1946 | – | 39.2 | – | 292,556 | 19.97 |
| 1954 | 7142 | – | 151 | 593,320 | 21.62 |
| 1955 | 7003 | – | 151 | 508,458 | 22.28 |
| 1956 | 6040 | – | 151 | 430,349 | 21.50 |
| 1957 | 6851 | – | 151 | 487,260 | 22.06 |
| 1958 | 6556 | – | 151 | 517,580 | 21.41 |
| 1961 | – | 41.2 | 151 | 544,798 | 20.72 |
| 1962 | – | 39.0 | 151 | 515,293 | 20.98 |
| 1963 | – | 40.77 | 151 | 539,330 | 20.38 |
| 1967 | – | 42.1 | 151 | 557,404 | 20.77 |
| 1972 | – | 36.4 | 151 | 482,370 | 18.99 |

== See also ==
- Timeline of the UK electricity supply industry
- List of power stations in England
- Blackburn Meadows power station
