= Selsey Beach railway station =

Short-lived railway station in Selsey, West Sussex

Selsey Beach

General information
- Location: Selsey, West Sussex; England
- Coordinates: 50.7336°N 0.7754°W
- Grid reference: SZ865933
- Platforms: 1

Other information
- Status: Disused

History
- Original company: West Sussex Railway

Key dates
- 1 August 1898: Opened
- October 1904: Closed
Location

Selsey Beach railway station served the town of Selsey, West Sussex, England, from 1898 to 1904 on the West Sussex Railway.

== History ==
The station was opened on 1 August 1898 by the West Sussex Railway. The handbook of stations states that it was only open in summer. It was a short-lived station, only being open for 6 years before closing in October 1904.

| Preceding station | Disused railways | Following station |
|---|---|---|
| Selsey Town; Line and station closed | West Sussex Railway | Terminus |
