= Tinsley Viaduct =

Road bridge in South Yorkshire, England

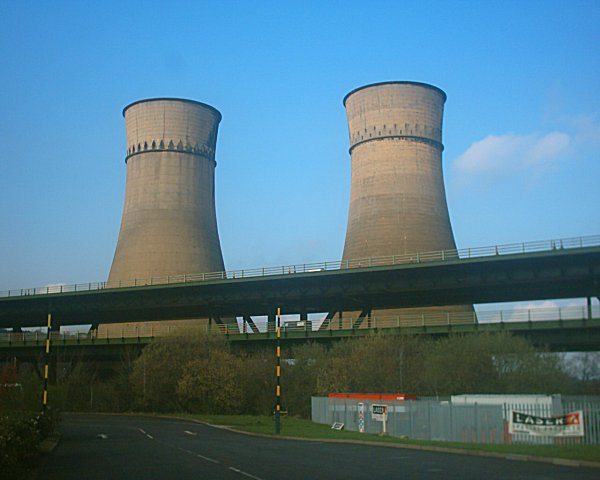
- Tinsley Viaduct as seen from Meadowhall, with the two cooling towers of the former Blackburn Meadows power station before their demolition in 2008.
- Coordinates: 53°25′03″N 1°24′21″W
- OS grid reference: SK394913
- Carries: M1; A631
- Crosses: River Don; Sheffield Canal; Midland Main Line; South Yorkshire Railway; Sheffield Supertram
- Locale: Tinsley/Wincobank
- Maintained by: National Highways

Characteristics
- Design: twin deck box girder bridge
- Total length: 1,033 m (3,389 ft)
- Width: 6 lanes
- Height: 20 m (66 ft) (to upper level)
- Longest span: 50 m (160 ft) (20 spans)
- Clearance above: 10 m (33 ft) (on the A631)
- Clearance below: 10 m (33 ft)

History
- Construction start: Spring 1965
- Construction end: 1968
- Opened: 25 March 1968 (lower deck); 19 October 1968 (upper deck)

Statistics
- Daily traffic: 100,000 vehicles/day

Location
- Interactive map of Tinsley Viaduct

Tinsley Viaduct is a two-tier road bridge in Sheffield, England; it was the first of its kind in the United Kingdom. It carries the M1 and the A631 for a distance of 3,389 feet (1,033 m) over the Don Valley, from Tinsley to Wincobank, also crossing the Sheffield Canal, the Midland Main Line, and the former South Yorkshire Railway line from Tinsley Junction to Rotherham Central. The Supertram route to Meadowhall runs below part of the viaduct on the trackbed of the South Yorkshire Railway line to Barnsley.

== History ==
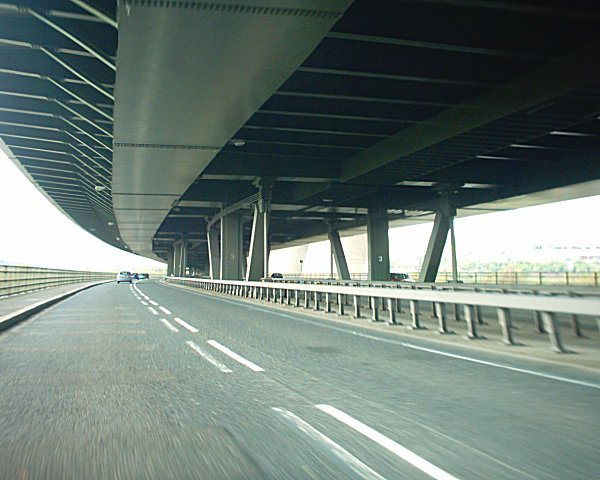
Tinsley Viaduct lower deck

The lower deck of the viaduct was opened in March 1968 and the upper deck, carrying the M1, on 19 October 1968. The build cost was £6 million. The structure is unusual in that it is built as steel box girders, at a time when most long-span bridges were being built of a post-tensioned concrete deck design. Because of the limited access to the site with numerous railway lines, the River Don, a canal, and factories in the way, a dual gauge (5ft 2½in and 3ft) railway was used in the construction of the viaduct with prefabricated box-girder sections being propelled from the north-western end of the viaduct by a Ruston & Hornsby diesel locomotive. The use of steel allowed a significant cost saving over alternative methods, but became controversial following two disasters involving steel bridges in 1970 (the West Gate Bridge in Australia and the Cleddau Bridge in Wales) and another in 1971 (the Koblenz South Bridge in Germany). Fifty-one people were killed in these failures, leading in the UK to the formation of the Merrison Committee. The report of the Merrison committee resulted in the temporary closure of two of the carriageways on the lower deck and two on the upper deck, the installation of extra steel strengthening bands around the bridge's support columns, and other works which were completed in 1983. A further programme of strengthening was completed in 2006. The recent work to strengthen the bridge was a very complex operation, with a lot of the work happening inside the box-beam spine. The works took over 3 years and cost £82 million (nearly 9 times the original bridge building cost, adjusting for inflation). The strengthening project won the British construction industry's Major Project Award in 2005.

Although originally designed to carry a dual 3-lane motorway on the top deck, during and subsequent to the strengthening work the M1 was reduced to 2 lanes following an EU directive on load-bearing capacity to allow for the introduction of 40-tonne trucks in the UK. This arrangement allowed the third lane in each direction to join from Junction 34 to make the busy junction safer. Since the opening of the M1 junction 32 to 35a smart motorway scheme in January 2017, the viaduct once again carries 3 lanes of traffic plus hard shoulders in each direction.

The viaduct is balanced on rollers to allow for thermal expansion and contraction, and the route weaves slightly in order to make its way past obstacles. The viaduct, due to its construction, is very flexible. Movement may be felt on the lower deck as the traffic passes overhead. The Meadowhall Shopping Centre lies in the valley to the west; to the east is the Blackburn Meadows sewage works and new biomass power station.

== Tinsley cooling towers ==
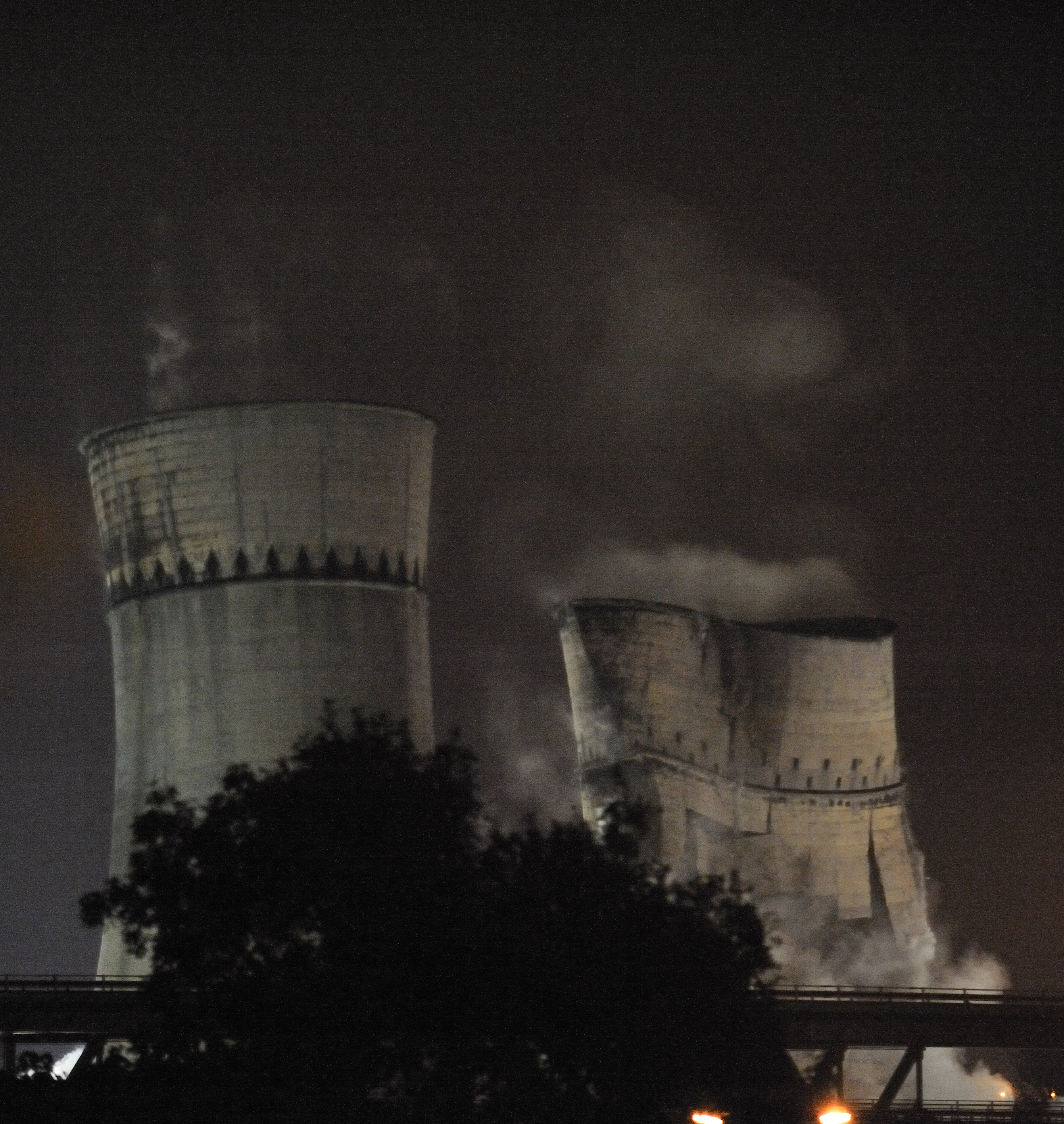
Demolition of Tinsley cooling towers on 24 August 2008.

The viaduct is one of Sheffield's most prominent landmarks, and was once made all the more so by the adjacent pair of cooling towers that were left standing for safety reasons after the demolition of the Blackburn Meadows Power Station. The cooling towers were a major point of contention over the years and were once saved from destruction only after being chosen as a nesting site by a rare bird. More recently, plans were made to turn them into a piece of public art. Other plans for the towers included concert halls, skate parks, and a theme park.

Their iconic status, and the possibly prohibitive costs of demolishing the towers safely, looked to have cemented their status in Sheffield's future as much as they were a part of its history, until the owner of the towers (and the now-demolished power station), E.ON UK, stated its intention to demolish them once the strengthening of the viaduct made it feasible.

The 250-foot (76-metre) towers were demolished at 03:00 BST on 24 August 2008, though a significant portion of the north tower remained standing for a short while. The demolition attracted widespread attention. A viewing platform was set up so the public could watch the demolition. Part of the site has been converted for use as a biomass power station by the owners E.ON UK.

== In popular culture ==
The Tinsley Viaduct is featured among several other locations as the site of "ground zero" for a fictional Soviet Union nuclear strike on Sheffield depicted in Threads (1984), a depiction of what might have happened had NATO and the Soviet Union entered conflict over hypothetical instability in Iran that escalated into full nuclear war. In the ensuing nuclear exchange, a one-megaton nuclear missile explodes above the Tinsley Viaduct, devastating most of surrounding Sheffield.

== See also ==
- List of bridges in the United Kingdom
