= Blackburn Meadows =

Area of land inside the Sheffield city at Tinsley

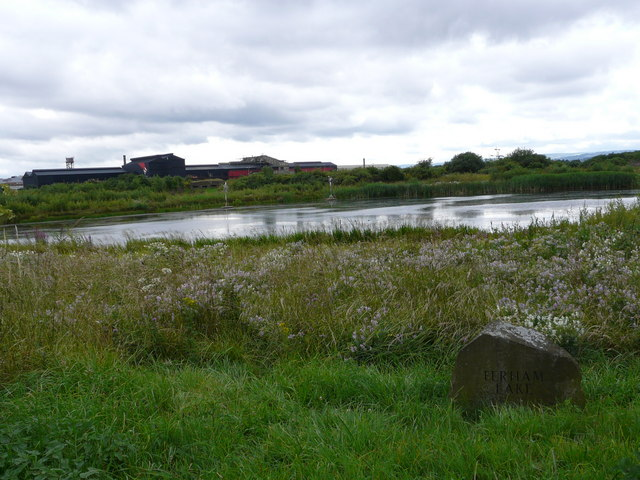
- The nature reserve, with the Magna Science Adventure Centre in the background

- Location within South Yorkshire
- Type: Waste Water Treatment Works
- Location: Sheffield, South Yorkshire, England
- Coordinates: 53°25′20″N 1°23′35″W
- Created: 1886
- Operator: Yorkshire Water

Blackburn Meadows is an area of land just inside the Sheffield city border at Tinsley, England. It became the location of the main sewage treatment works for the city in 1884, and is now one of the largest treatment works in Britain. The treatment process was rudimentary, with sludge being removed to ponds and then to drying beds, after which it was used as manure or transferred by rail to a tip at Kilnhurst. The works progressively expanded to improve the quality of effluent discharged to the River Don and was a pioneer in the use of bio-aeration, following experiments by the works manager during the First World War. This process became known as the "Sheffield System", and was demonstrated to visitors from Great Britain and abroad. Despite these improvements, ammonia levels in the river below the works were high, and fish populations did not survive.

The works had its own internal standard gauge railway for over 100 years, which used three steam and three diesel locomotives over the course of its existence, until its replacement by road vehicles in the 1990s. During the 1926 general strike, the locomotives hauled trains over the main line, delivering wagons to Kilnhurst tip under a special dispensation. By the 1960s, the Sheffield sewer system was inadequate for the volume of effluent produced, and the Don Valley Interceptor Sewer was tunnelled beneath the city to the works, enabling 26 storm sewage overflows into the river to be shut down. Water quality was further improved by a new treatment process installed in 1992 to reduce ammonia levels, enabling fish stocks to be re-established in the lower River Don. Subsequent improvements have been made so that the works complies with the Waste Incineration Directive and the Freshwater Fish Directive. The works was inundated by flood water on 25 June 2007, when the Don burst its banks, but was recommissioned in just 18 days.

A power station was operational on the southern part of the site from 1921, supplying electricity to the steel works of the Lower Don Valley. Although it closed in October 1980, two of its cooling towers which were designed by L. G. Mouchel and Partners in 1937, remained until 2008, as demolition was difficult because of their proximity to Tinsley Viaduct, which carries the M1 motorway across the Don valley. Following extensive upgrading of the treatment works, to improve the quality of discharges to the river still further, the sludge beds became redundant, and have been turned into a nature reserve, providing habitat for migrating birds.

== Sewage Treatment Works ==
Blackburn Meadows is the lowest point within Sheffield City Council area. The River Don flows out of the city under Templeborough railway bridge past a benchmark set at 96 feet (29.27 m) above sea level. The meadows therefore formed a good site for a sewage treatment works, and Blackburn Meadows works was opened in 1886. It is located on a site to the north of the Don, and to the east of Tinsley Viaduct. In 2006 it was claimed to be the second largest treatment works in the United Kingdom, processing 79 million gallons (360,000 m^{3}) of effluent each day, with only the works at Leeds processing more.

=== History ===
As the population of Sheffield increased, Sheffield Corporation bought 23 acres (9.3 ha) of land at Blackburn Meadows, on which to build a sewage treatment works. In August 1884, William Bissett and Son won the contract for its construction, which was overseen by Thomas West, who acted as Clerk of Works. 100 feet (30 m) of standard gauge railway track connected the limeshed to a junction with the Manchester, Sheffield and Lincolnshire Railway. Bissetts had completed their work by January 1886, and although £2,462 had been spent on extras, their final bill came to £23,933, which was £27 cheaper than the original contract value. Savings were made by using concrete for the foundations and bottoms of tanks, rather than brick and puddle clay.

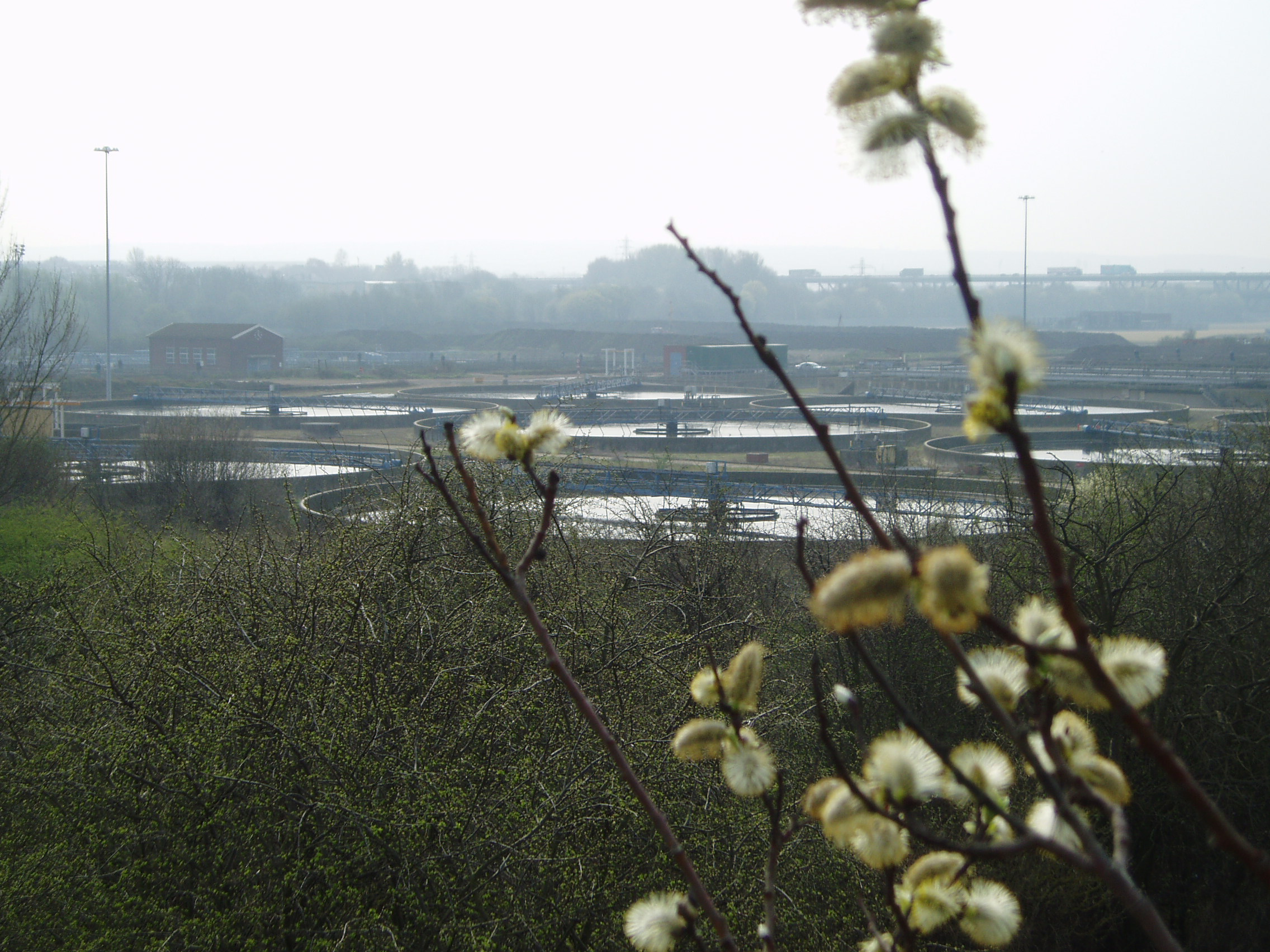
Some of the settling tanks at the treatment works

By mid-1886, the works was complete, and the Mayor, J. W. Pye-Smith Esq, officially opened it on 2 June. The event was witnessed by members of the Council, and by invited guests, which included a representative from the London Metropolitan Board of Works. Reports at the time indicated that the sewage passed through catch pits by gravity, allowing solids to settle, which were removed weekly. Milk of lime was then added as it flowed through mixing channels, after which it entered rectangular settling tanks. Next it passed on to a number of precipitating tanks, each holding 50,000 imperial gallons (230 m^{3}), where after 30 minutes of settling, it passed over aerating weirs. Finally it ran through coke filters and was discharged into the river. Around 100 long tons (100 t) of sludge was removed from the precipitating tanks each day, to be pumped into ponds. Once the water had drained off, it was moved to drying beds, and was then used as manure by farmers, or was taken by rail to a tip at Kilnhurst, near Rotherham. Initially, there were 30 precipitating tanks and 60 aerating or filtering tanks.

The railway also developed, with the acquisition of 250 yards (230 m) of portable track and six tipping wagons in 1889, a steam crane later the same year, and more wagons in 1891 and 1892. The first locomotive arrived in 1898, after its purchase from the Yorkshire Engine Company. It was an 0-4-0 saddle tank, which had been built in 1875 for use as a contractor's engine, and had been refurbished by the manufacturer. A maintenance contract for the wagons lapsed in 1900, as the men at the works had become proficient at repairs.

In parallel with the construction of the works, trunk sewers were built to convey sewage from the city to the works. These was a major programme of expansion to the sewer network in 1910, to ensure that it could cope with the expected volumes of effluent produced. Because British sewers are also expected to handle rainwater, a series of storm sewage overflows were provided, which resulted in diluted sewage being discharged into the River Don in times of heavy rainfall.

=== Expansion ===
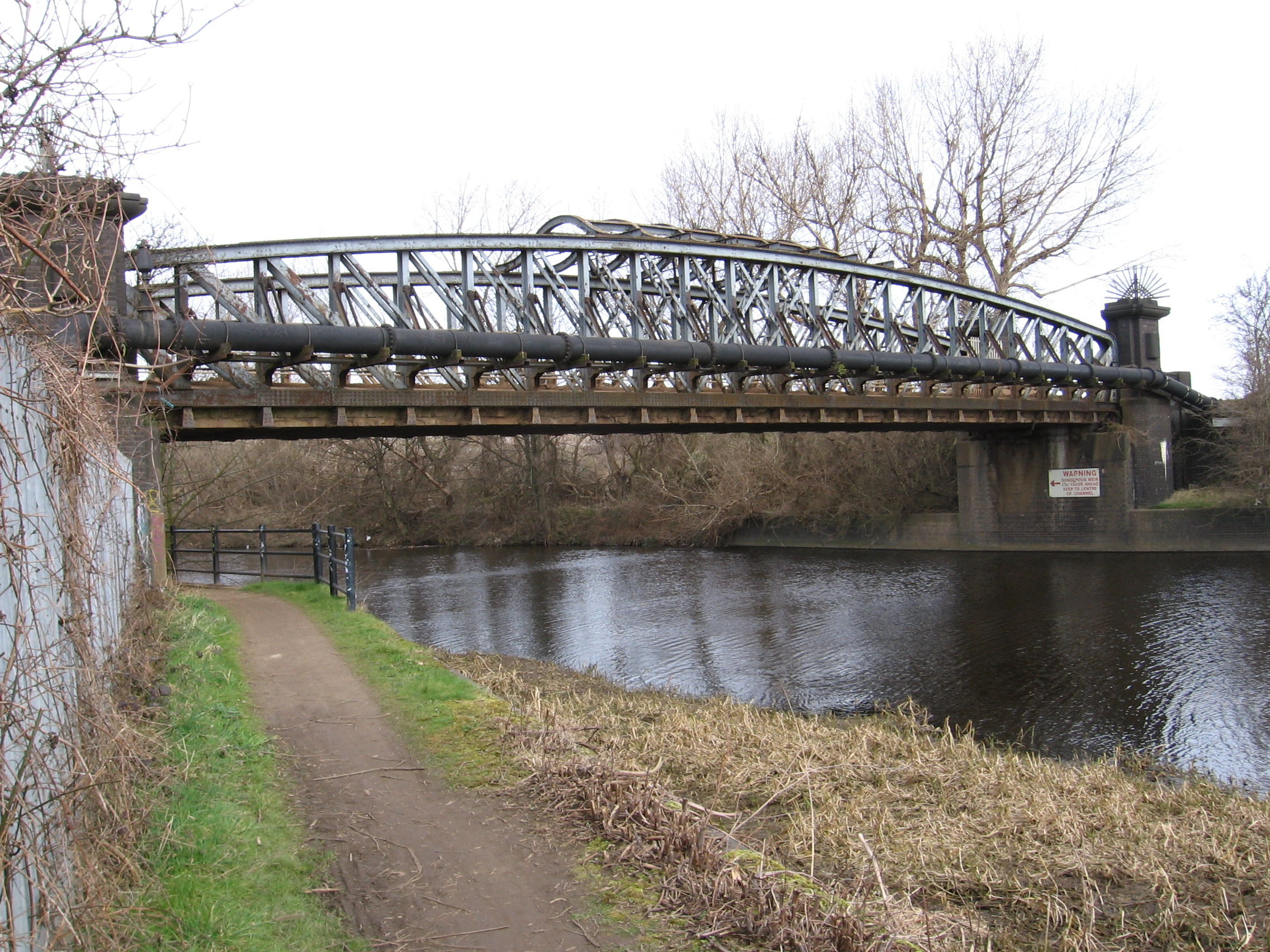
Jordan Bridge, which carried the internal railway over the River Don Navigation to reach the sludge beds

The quality of the effluent discharged into the Don was soon giving rise to concern, as the treatment process was unsatisfactory. An act of Parliament was obtained in 1900, which allowed Sheffield Corporation to buy an additional 105 acres (42 ha), on which contact beds would be built, so that the effluent could be better treated before discharge. The initial plan was costed at £367,355, which was reduced to £270,369 when secondary contact beds were removed from the scheme. The Local Government Board approved the plans on 13 May 1905, paving the way for the construction of a biological treatment system, instead of the system using lime. Logan and Hemmingway, who were contractors based at Nottingham, won the initial contract for excavations, and also the subsequent one for the construction of six settling tanks, 24 contact tanks, and Jordan bridge, which would carry the internal railway line over the River Don Navigation. The contract was worth £41,046, and further contracts followed, which included £36,500 for 36 more contact beds and three settling tanks, £5,000 for excavating 40,000 cubic yards (31,000 m^{3}) of earth, and £36,484 for storm beds and other work, which was subsequently raised to £39,184, so that they could pay their workers at the same rate as Sheffield Corporation paid their own workmen.

The Lord Mayor opened the first part of the new works on 28 October 1909, and Sheffield Council increased the amount of land they owned for sewage treatment to 226.5 acres (91.7 ha) by buying another 81 acres (33 ha), on which contact beds could be constructed if required at a later date. Discharges to the river were still of poor quality, and a secondary treatment process was designed, although its implementation was delayed by the onset of the First World War. However, John Haworth became works manager in 1914, and began to experiment with ways to treat the effluent. A continuous narrow channel was constructed within a tank, and paddles were used to agitate the liquid. This allowed it to become oxygenated, which supported bacteria, allowing them to digest the sewage. The process was called bio-aeration, but became known as the "Sheffield System", and a steady stream of people came to inspect the works, both from local authorities in Great Britain and from overseas. Many of the contact beds were converted to use the new system between 1922 and 1927. The treatment process significantly reduced the biochemical oxygen demand of the effluent discharged to the river, but was not good at removing ammonia, which was a major contributor to the poor water quality of the river below the works, and the destruction of the fish populations. The effluent regularly contained more than 20 mg/L of ammonia, which resulted in levels of over 10 mg/L in the river. Few fish can survive in concentrations of over 2 mg/L.

In 1915, the Corporation had made enquiries about purchasing a second-hand steam engine, approaching six locomotive manufacturers, but eventually acquired a new 0-4-0 saddle tank from Peckett and Sons Ltd, which was built at their Bristol works in 1918. The original engine became a spare, but was hired out to the Blackburn Meadows power station in March 1936. A year later it was condemned by the insurance company, and was sold for scrap to Maden and McKee Ltd, who were based in Liverpool. A replacement was sought, and a third 0-4-0 saddle tank, made by Hudswell Clarke in 1914, was bought from the Olympia Oil and Cake Company at Selby. It was coupled into a goods train, and arrived at the works in July 1937. At the works, as at Selby, it carried the name Olympia, painted on the tanks. The Peckett was overhauled by the Yorkshire Engine Company at Meadow Hall Works between 1945 and 1946. Because there was a statutory obligation to keep the treatment works operational, a special dispensation was obtained during the 1926 general strike, to allow this engine to run over the main line, delivering wagons to Kilnhurst tip. Kilnhurst tip eventually became full, and in January 1948, regular tipping operations ceased, after a new tip at Thrybergh opened. Tipping continued at Kilnhurst sporadically, until it was closed in 1959. During its operational life up to 1948, 2,917,480 tons of sewage sludge was dumped at the site, and following closure, it was sold to the National Coal Board in 1961.

=== Modernisation ===
The entire works was upgraded between 1956 and 1969, in five distinct phases. The plan was announced in January 1956, and was expected to cost £1 million. The first phase was the construction of a filter pressing plant, for which the main contractor was Norwest Construction Co Ltd, while the actual presses and other plant were supplied by S. H. Johnson and Co Ltd. This phase was completed in 1962, and was officially opened by the Lord Mayor on 14 May 1963. The second phase consisted of a preliminary treatment plant, a storm sewage separation plant, and metering of the flows within the plant. This was completed in 1965. The third phase was split into two parts, which initially involved the building of new primary sedimentation tanks. Once these were operational in 1969, the old sedimentation tanks were converted to become temporary storm sewage tanks. This fourth phase was called phase 3b, and was completed in 1970. The final phase was the construction of a sludge incinerator, which was completed in 1969 and meant that the pressed sewage cake did not have to be taken to Thrybergh to be dumped.

The railway was also upgraded at this time. Thomas Ward Ltd supplied replacement track in 1955, and a new 0-4-0 diesel electric shunter was ordered from Ruston and Hornsby Ltd in 1959. It was delivered from Lincoln on a low-loader in 1960, and was so successful that a second engine of the same type was ordered the following year. The Hudswell Clarke steam engine was cut up on site in 1962, but the Corporation wrote to Peckett's to see if they would convert the Peckett engine to diesel hydraulic transmission. Peckett's declined, and so the engine was converted at the works, by cutting off the boiler and saddle tank, and fitting a Perkins diesel engine removed from a crane. It was completed on 12 May 1962, and worked well, although it spent most of its subsequent life working at Thrybergh tip. It returned to Blackburn Meadows in 1967, and was cut up later that year. A prototype steel side-tipping wagon was ordered from Robert Hudson Ltd of Leeds in 1955, and a further 22 followed in 1957, to replace the original wooden wagons. Charles Roberts and Co Ltd of Wakefield supplied 12 more in 1958, and a further 35 in 1961, with Hudsons supplying the final 6 in 1963.

In 1976, a new diesel shunting locomotive, made by Thomas Hill of Rotherham was purchased. It was built at Kilnhurst, and driven along the ex-Great Central Railway line from there to the works. The first Ruston and Hornsby engine was partially dismantled, and eventually cut up in January 1978. The connection between the works and the British Rail network was cut in 1984, and the system became one of a very small number of isolated standard gauge railways. By 1986, the track layout had been simplified, and the track across Jordan bridge had been lifted. When rail operation ceased in the 1990s, one of the Hudson tipping wagons went to the National Railway Museum at Shildon, and the Thomas Hill engine, after several changes of ownership, is now located on the Peak Rail preserved railway at Matlock.

By the 1960s, the Sheffield sewers were inadequate for the volume of effluent, and overflowed into the river during periods of light rainfall and sometimes when there was no rainfall. Some of them had been in use for 80 years, and inspection revealed that major reconstruction was required. The solution adopted was to tunnel the Don Valley Interceptor Sewer through the Carboniferous rock beneath the existing sewers. Work began of the first phase in 1979, when 1.33 miles (2.14 km) of 18-foot (5.5 m) tunnel were built from the works to a drop shaft in Hawke Street. A new pumping station was required at Blackburn Meadows, and this phase was completed in July 1983. Over the next decade, four further phases were completed, involving the tunnelling of 1.39 miles (2.24 km) of sewer with a diameter of 12 feet (3.7 m) to a drop shaft near Furnival Road, a new sewer from Furnival Road to the Whitbread Brewery with another from the Sheaf Valley sewer to the central bus station, extension of the Don Valley sewer to Gilpin Street, and finally extension from Gilpin Street to Livesey Street in Hillsborough. As a result of this work, the capacity of the sewers was greatly increased, and 26 storm sewage overflows were closed, resulting in significant improvement to water quality in the river.

=== Improvements ===
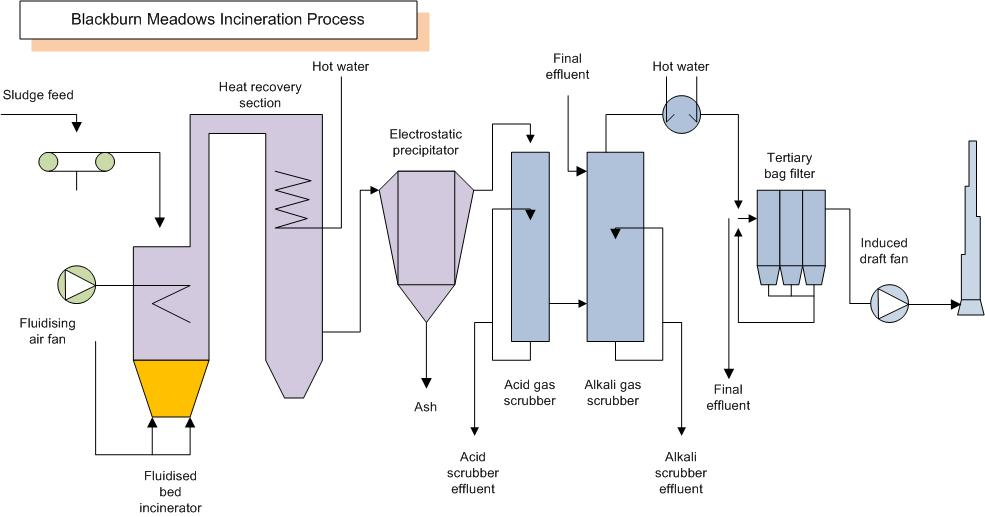
Diagram of the sewage sludge incineration process

In 1992, the problem of ammonia levels in the final effluent was addressed by the construction of a system using anoxic zones and diffuse air activated sludge treatment. This dramatically reduced ammonia levels, and was the most significant factor in the re-establishment of fish stocks in the lower River Don. In 1990, the outdated filter presshouse and incineration plant were replaced by a new sludge-dewatering plant and a fluidized-bed incinerator. The new plant made the old sludge beds, situated to the east of the River Don and on the island formed by the Don and the Holmes Cut, redundant, and these have now become a nature reserve. Further improvements to the process were completed by 2005. These included an upgrade to the wet scrubbing system, in order to remove heavy metals and acid gases such as sulphur dioxide, hydrogen chloride and hydrogen fluoride from the flue gases produced by the incinerator, and the addition of a tertiary adsorption filter, which removes mercury and dioxins. The improvements were designed to ensure that the plant met the standards set out in the Waste Incineration Directive.

The outflow from the works, which passes under the River Don Navigation and joins the river beside Jordans weir, has in the past been a major contributor to the pollution of the River Don, but some £70 million has been invested in upgrading the plant, to ensure that discharges to the river meet the requirements of the Freshwater Fish Directive. In dry weather, the outfall discharges 30 million gallons (136,000 m^{3}) of treated water each day, more than doubling the flow in the river at this point.

The works was shut down on 25 June 2007, after the Don burst its banks, and the entire site was engulfed by several feet of water. It remained submerged for over a week, with much of the equipment suffering catastrophic damage. Once the water subsided, imaginative ways had to be found to return it to operation within a reasonable time. The analyser which measures emissions from the incinerator plant had been completely destroyed, and in order to mitigate a 16-week delivery time, the manufacturers removed one from a training centre at Telford, and it was hired by Yorkshire Water until a new unit could be supplied. The plant was recommissioned and operational just 18 days after its inundation.

In 2012, a contract for the construction of a mesophilic anaerobic digestion facility was awarded, including the construction of buildings and various other pieces of equipment required for the treatment of sludge. Mesophilic anaerobic digestion enables the breaking down of biodegradable materials using micro-organisms under moderate temperatures. The new sludge treatment facility enables the recycled sludge to be used on neighbouring farmlands as manure, and also enables Yorkshire Water to generate 1.9MW of renewable energy using combined heat and power units.

== Association with biological warfare ==
In 1942 Olympia Oil and Cake Company (based in Blackburn Meadows) was outsourced to produce 5,273,400 cakes by the Porton Down biology department for use in Operation Vegetarian.

== Power station ==
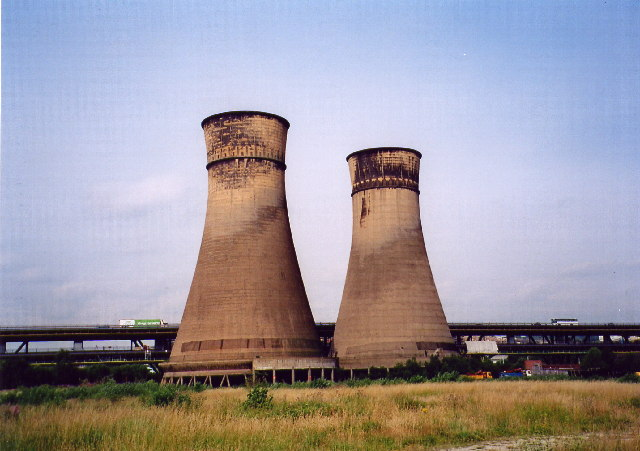
The cooling towers prior to demolition

In 1921, Sheffield Corporation built a coal-fired power station on spare land at the south west corner of Blackburn Meadows. At the time there was no national grid, and the steelworks which occupied much of the Lower Don Valley needed additional electrical power. The chosen site was close to the steel works, was near the river, which supplied cooling water, and was well-served by railway lines, to deliver coal. The station was modified between 1937 and 1942, when its capacity was increased to 72 megawatts, and remained operational until the 1980s. When the rest of the power station was demolished, two of its seven cooling towers were left standing due to their close proximity to the M1 motorway, and the risk that their demolition might cause Tinsley Viaduct to be damaged. The 250-foot (76 m) towers were hyperbolic in shape, and were designed by L. G. Mouchel and Partners, who had also been responsible for the first such towers erected at Liverpool in 1925. The Blackburn Meadows towers were built between 1937 and 1938. English Heritage considered whether they should be designated as listed structures, but ruled against it because the internal cooling structures had been removed, and there was no context for them, as the rest of the station no longer existed. On 24 August 2008, at 3 am, the two landmark towers were finally demolished with explosives, without damaging the motorway.

In 2011, as part of Sheffield City Council's drive to become self-sufficient for energy, construction of a biomass power station began. It is operated by E.ON UK, and was completed in 2014. It generates 30 megawatts by burning waste wood, sourced from the United Kingdom, and waste heat is captured to provide a district heating scheme.

== Nature reserve ==
In 1993 Sheffield City Council negotiated with Yorkshire Water and leased an unused part of the former sewage works for 99 years, at an annual rent of one peppercorn, to enable it to be reclaimed and turned into a nature reserve. In order to manage the project, a consortium was formed, with representation from Sheffield City Council, Sheffield Wildlife Trust, South Yorkshire Forest and Yorkshire Water. It now provides habitat for migrating birds, for which it is an area of European significance. The Wildlife Trust runs an active programme of school education visits. In 2005 the City Council exercised an option to increase the size of the reserve by taking over additional land from Yorkshire Water.

== Bibliography ==
- Abbott, Justin; Jones, Ken; Wright, Steve (April 2004). "Yorkshire Water's Sewage Sludge Incinerators" (PDF). Wastewater Treatment and Sewerage. Archived (PDF) from the original on 2 August 2016.
- Booth, A. J. (1986). Sheffield's Sewage Works Railways. Industrial Railway Society. OCLC 877087235.
- Firth, Christopher (1997). Domesday to the dawn of the New Millennium - 900 years of the Don fishery. Environment Agency. (This is available online at The Don Catchment Rivers Trust. Page numbers refer to the pdf file).
- Lima, R.; Bachmann, R. (2002). "Blackburn meadows wastewater treatment works". International Journal of Water. 2: 35. doi:10.1504/IJW.2002.002076. hdl:10198/1421.
- Tolan, D. J.; Bennett, D.; Kwiecinski, J. V. (June 1991). "Blackburn Meadows Sewage-Treatment Works: Sludge Incineration into the 1990s". Water and Environment Journal. 5 (3): 239–248. doi:10.1111/j.1747-6593.1991.tb00616.x.
