= Tinsley, South Yorkshire =

Suburb of Sheffield, England

Coordinates: 53.412°N 1.404°W

Tinsley
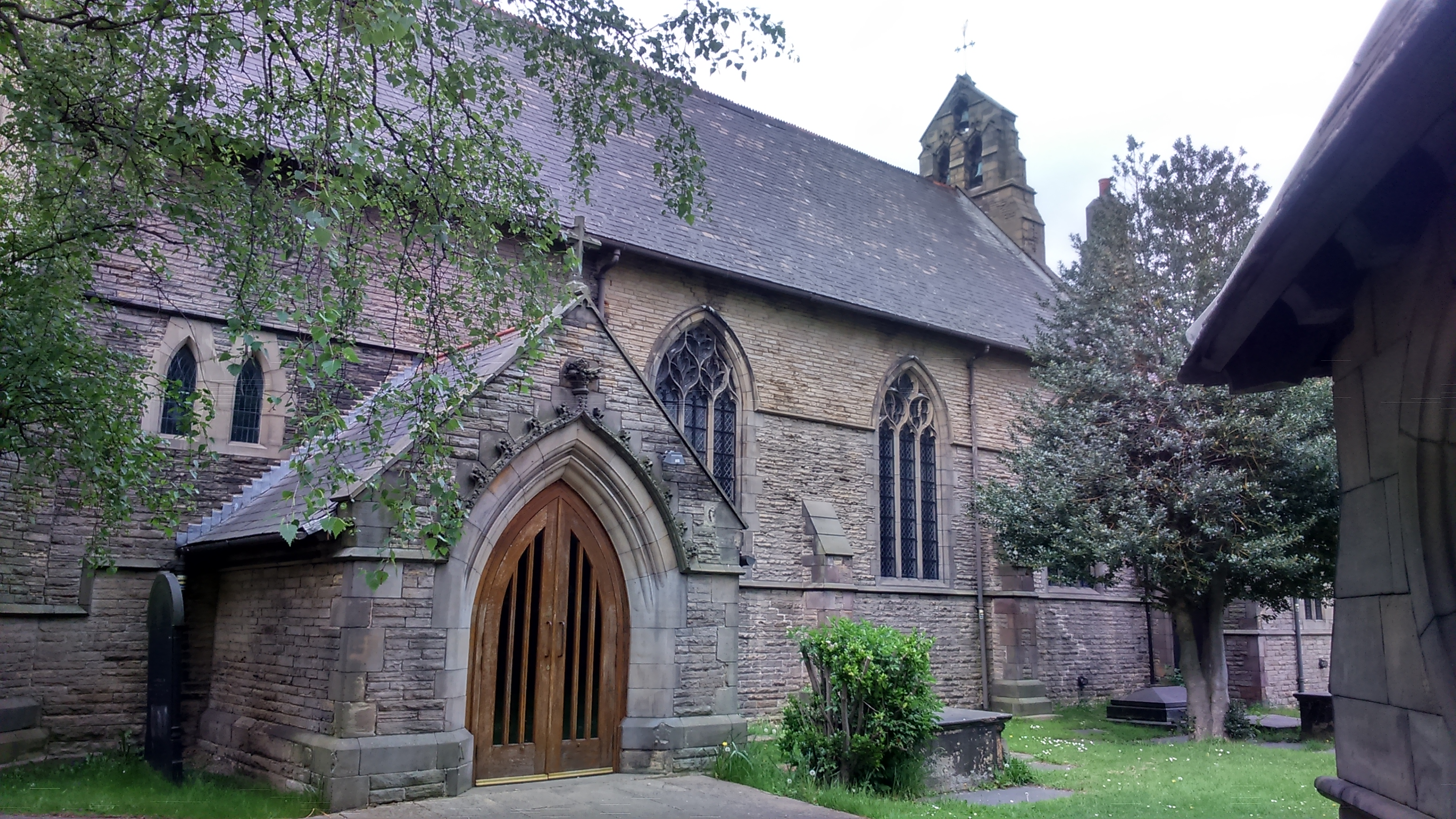
- Church of St Lawrence

- Location within South Yorkshire
- OS grid reference: SK395907
- Metropolitan borough: Sheffield
- Metropolitan county: South Yorkshire
- Region: Yorkshire and the Humber
- Country: England
- Sovereign state: United Kingdom
- Post town: SHEFFIELD
- Postcode district: S9
- Dialling code: 0114
- Police: South Yorkshire
- Fire: South Yorkshire
- Ambulance: Yorkshire
- UK Parliament: Sheffield South East

Tinsley is a suburb of north-eastern Sheffield, South Yorkshire, England; it falls within the Darnall ward of the city.

The area is associated with:

- The former Tinsley Marshalling Yard, which was used between 1965 and 1998 to separate railway wagons from incoming freight trains and add them to new trains.
- The former Tinsley railway maintenance depot between 1964 and 1998; at its peak, 200 locomotives were allocated here.
- The former Tinsley Towers.
- Tinsley Viaduct, which carries the M1 motorway across the Don Valley.

It was formerly in the West Riding of Yorkshire.

== History ==
The name of the suburb derives from the Old English Tingas-Leah, which means 'Field of Council', cognate with "thing (assembly)" and "lea", a dialectal word for "meadow". It is mentioned as 'Tirneslawe' or 'Tineslawe' in the Domesday Book of 1086 when it was in the possession of Roger de Busli.

The chapel of St Lawrence, Tinsley was built in 1877 on the site of an ancient (possibly of Anglo-Saxon origin) chapel. An annual royal payment was received until 1847 in order that a service for the dead could be held.

Another tradition associated with the settlement required the Lord of the Manor of Tinsley to take a pair of white gloves to the Lord of Tickhill each year at Michaelmas, and receive in return a white dove to keep over winter.

Tinsley Wood lay to the south of the settlement, on land now partly occupied by Sheffield City Airport and High Hazels Park. It may have been the site of the Battle of Brunanburh in 937, where Athelstan of Wessex gained the submission of the Celtic monarchs of Norse-Ireland and around Britain. In the mediaeval period, it was associated with outlaws, one named as "Roger de Presteman, an outlawe of Tyneslawe".

The area became industrialised from 1732, when the River Don Navigation was extended to terminate in the village. A turnpike road was constructed to Sheffield. In 1819, the Sheffield Canal was opened, running from Tinsley to Sheffield. The area became major industrial centre known for its collieries, iron, steel, and wire works.

Companies such as George Cohen, the '600 works', BOC, Osbourn Hadfield and Brinsworth Strip Mills were occupants of the landscape near Tinsley and the neighbouring area of Templeborough, Rotherham. Only the BOC plant and Brinsworth Strip Mills remain within the village boundaries. All the remaining works were either demolished or preserved as a museum to what was the heart of Sheffield industry until 1985. The Blackburn Meadows power station is also located in the area and was home to the Tinsley Towers, a well-known landmark next to the M1 viaduct. The original station closed in 1980 however the towers remained for safety reasons. They were demolished in a controlled explosion on 24 August 2008. A £120m biomass power station was later built on the site and opened in 2014.

Tinsley was formerly a township and chapelry in the parish of Rotherham, in 1866 Tinsley became a separate civil parish, on 1 April 1933 the parish was abolished and merged with Sheffield. In 1931 the parish had a population of 6361. It is now in the unparished area of Sheffield.

== Facilities and attractions ==
Replacing the steelworks on Vulcan Road is the Meadowhall shopping centre. The associated Tinsley Meadowhall South tram stop on the South Yorkshire Supertram network, served by Yellow route and Tram-Train services, provides public transport access to the Tinsley area.

Located 220 yards (200 m) from the M1 in the centre of Tinsley is the Tinsley Recreation ground (sometimes referred to as "the Rec") - a 10.2 acres (4.1 ha) site which has been used for sport since the 1890s. Recently, part of this has been claimed as a community centre called Tinsley Green. It has a new 5-aside football pitch, Tennis court, children's playground, adult rides and a cricket bowling practice area.

From 1997 to 2008 the area was home to the Sheffield City Airport, a small airport which offered mostly business-orientated flights to domestic locations in the UK and select cities in Western Europe. The airport closed to commercial traffic amidst controversy in 2002 and permanently in 2008 when its CAA Licence was withdrawn. The site is in the process of being converted to a business park with several major developments already open, part of the Advanced Manufacturing Research Centre a collaboration between The University of Sheffield and industrial partners.

The area around the old airport site house several industrial units and modern business complexes. The latest being Bessemer Park on Shepcote Lane with the new ITM Power Complex.
