= Education in Sheffield =

Formal education in Sheffield, England, takes place at the city's two universities, 141 primary schools and 28 secondary schools.

The University of Sheffield and Sheffield Hallam University combined bring 55,000 students to the city every year, including many from the Far East. As a result of its large student population, Sheffield has many bars, cafes, clubs, and shops as well as student housing to accommodate them.

Sheffield has two further education colleges. Sheffield College is organised on a collegiate basis and was originally created from the merger of six colleges around the city, since reduced to three main centres: City in the city centre, Hillsborough in the north, and Norton in the south, each operating as semi-autonomous constituents of Sheffield College. Longley Park Sixth Form, opened in 2004.

Eight of the secondary schools have sixth forms, namely High Storrs, King Ecgbert, King Edward VII, Silverdale, Tapton, Meadowhead, UTC Sheffield City Centre and UTC Sheffield Olympic Legacy Park, all lying in the south or west of Sheffield (with the exception of the Olympic Legacy Park), and the two Catholic schools, All Saints and Notre Dame. The full list of state-funded secondary schools is:

- All Saints Catholic High School, Sheffield (voluntary aided)
- Birley Community College
- Bradfield School
- Chaucer School
- Ecclesfield School
- Fir Vale School (formerly Earl Marshal)
- Firth Park Academy
- Forge Valley School
- Handsworth Grange School
- High Storrs School
- Hinde House School
- King Ecgbert School
- King Edward VII School
- Meadowhead School
- Newfield Secondary School
- Notre Dame Catholic High School (voluntary aided)
- Outwood Academy City
- Parkwood E-ACT Academy (formerly Parkwood High & Herries)
- Sheffield Park Academy (formerly Waltheof)
- Sheffield Springs Academy (formerly Myrtle Springs, formerly Hurlfield)
- Silverdale School
- Stocksbridge High School
- Tapton School
- UTC Sheffield City Centre
- UTC Sheffield Olympic Legacy Park
- Westfield School
- Yewlands Technology College

There are also seven private schools, most notably Birkdale School and the Sheffield High School for Girls.

== History ==
Formal education in Sheffield goes back some 500 years or more. It is noted that the Canons of Beauchief Abbey engaged a teacher in 1490 to instruct boys and novices in grammar and singing. One of the earliest of Sheffield's schools is mentioned in the books of the Church Burgesses, when in 1564, a Mr Yonge obtained a licence to keep a school. In 1604, Thomas Smith (who was probably born in Sheffield) of Crowland in Lincolnshire, left the sum of £30 per year for running a Free Grammar School. The founding of the school was permitted by King James I and he gave instructions that the school should be called the King James Grammar School.

In 1648, Sheffield Castle was demolished and some of the stone was used to build a new grammar school in Townhead Street, The Free Grammar School of King James of England, within the town of Sheffield, in the County of York. It remained in use until 1825, when a new school was built in St George's Square. Many other schools were built in Sheffield during this period and some were very highly regarded, having taught some of the leading citizens of the country.

Another first for Sheffield occurred after the passing of the Elementary Education Act 1870. The first school to be built in England under the Act was Newhall School at Attercliffe in 1873. In the same year, Broomhall School was opened, quickly followed by Netherthorpe and Philadelphia.

In 1874 a plan was produced by the Sheffield architects, Innocent and Brown, for the laying out of Leopold Street and the realignment of Church Street and Bow Street (now West Street). In 1876 the area between Orchard Lane, West Street, Orchard Street and Balm Green was covered by a huddle of old houses in two streets now gone (Smith Street and Sands Paviours). This site was bought by the Sheffield School Board (SSB) for building the Central Schools and offices for themselves. At this time, Mark Firth (of steel fame) was interested in founding an Adult Education College which he intended should become a University College, so the Board sold him part of the site at the corner of West Street. The new building, called the Firth College after its benefactor, was opened by Prince Leopold (hence Leopold Street) in 1879.

The following year the Central Schools were opened by Earl Spencer. They consisted of an infants' school, a junior school, a separate school for standards V and VI and a Higher School which was to give secondary education without actually saying so - as the Board did not then have full legal powers. Their aim was to provide candidates of university standard for Firth College. The Higher School is claimed to have been the first secondary school to be opened by a school board in England.

At the various opening ceremonies, it was praised as an amazing and advanced school and was an early example of non-discrimination against women in education. Both boys and girls were admitted by examination, from all the elementary schools administered by the Board.

As soon as Firth College was finished, the then Medical School made plans to leave Surrey Street and build nearby. The school was completed in 1887. In 1897 Firth College and its branch - the Technical College in St George's Square - were combined with the Medical School to form the University College of Sheffield. In 1905, the College obtained its full University Charter and moved to new premises in Weston Park. The Central School then expanded into the newly vacated buildings.

In 1891, J B Mitchell-Withers won an architectural competition for additions to the Central School. These were opened in 1895 by the Secretary for Education, Sir George Kokowith.

In 1896, the Free Writing School in School Croft, used by the Pupil Teacher Centre for day classes, was bought by the Council for demolition as part of a slum clearance and road widening scheme. This meant that a new home for the Centre was needed and the Board decided to build on the vacant plot at the corner of Orchard Lane and Holly Street. The building was to accommodate all pupil teachers from Board and Voluntary Schools, together with preparatory classes made up of candidates for pupil-teachership. The new building was opened in 1899 by the Duke of Devonshire.

Further extensions and additions were made after the turn of the century, but the last significant building was the Education Enquiry Office fronting West Street. This building was fitted with an early form of air conditioning. The incoming air was passed through canvas sheets constantly sprayed with water jets, heated and taken up ducts inside pilasters. Alternate pilasters were used as exhaust ducts with an extract fan on the roof.

By 1892, the various schools began to acquire identities becoming Bow Street Elementary School, the Central Higher Schools and the Pupil Teacher Centre. In 1902 when the new Education Committee of the City Council had full powers to provide secondary education, the Higher School was divided into two; the boys remaining in the old building and its extensions while the girls moved into the Firth College building. This situation continued until 1933 when both schools moved to new premises at High Storrs.

The Pupil Teacher Centre then transferred to the vacant premises in Orchard Lane. Discussions were held during 1936 with a view to changing the Centre to a secondary school and permission was granted for the change in February 1937. Thus was born the City Secondary School, but it didn't keep this name for long. In 1940 the Secondary Education Sub Committee recommended:

"That the Secondary Schools provided and maintained by the Education Committee be named "Grammar" Schools instead of "Secondary" Schools, as recommended in the Spens Report on Secondary Education."

== See also ==
- List of schools in Sheffield
- The Online College
