= List of schools in Sheffield =

This is a list of schools in Sheffield in the English county of South Yorkshire.

== State-funded schools ==
=== Primary schools ===
- Abbey Lane Primary School
- Abbeyfield Primary Academy
- Acres Hill Community Primary School
- Angram Bank Primary School
- Anns Grove Primary School
- Arbourthorne Community Primary School
- Astrea Academy Sheffield
- Athelstan Primary School
- Ballifield Primary School
- Bankwood Community Primary School
- Beck Primary School
- Beighton School
- Birley Primary Academy
- Birley Spa Primary Academy
- Bradfield Dungworth Primary School
- Bradway Primary School
- Brightside Infant School
- Brook House Junior
- Broomhill Infant School
- Brunswick Community Primary School
- Byron Wood Primary Academy
- Carfield Primary School
- Carter Knowle Junior School
- Charnock Hall Primary Academy
- Clifford All Saints CE Primary School
- Coit Primary School
- Concord Junior School
- Deepcar St John's CE Junior School
- Dobcroft Infant School
- Dobcroft School
- Dore Primary School
- E-ACT school
- Ecclesall Primary School
- Ecclesfield Primary School
- Emmanuel CE/Methodist Junior School
- Emmaus RC and CE Primary School
- Fox Hill Primary
- Gleadless Primary School
- Greengate Lane Academy
- Greenhill Primary School
- Grenoside Community Primary School
- Greystones Primary School
- Halfway

School

- Halfway School
- Hallam Primary School
- Hartley Brook Primary School
- Hatfield Academy
- High Green Primary School
- High Hazels school
- High Hazels

School

- Hillsborough Primary School
- Hinde School
- Holt School
- Hucklow Primary School
- Hunter's School
- Hunter's

School

- Intake Primary School
- Limpsfield Junior School
- Lound School
- Lound

School

- Lowedges school
- Lower Primary School
- Lowfield Community Primary School
- Loxley Primary School
- Lydgate Infant School
- Lydgate Junior School
- Malin Bridge Primary School
- Manor Lodge Community Primary School
- Mansel Primary
- Marlcliffe Community Primary School
- Meersbrook Bank Primary School
- Meynell school
- Mundella Primary School
- Nether Edge Primary School
- Nether Green Infant School
- Nether Green Junior School
- Netherthorpe Primary School
- Nook Lane Junior School
- Norfolk Community Primary School
- Norton Free CE Primary School
- Oasis Academy Don Valley
- Oasis Academy Fir vale
- Oasis Academy Watermead
- Oughtibridge Primary School
- Owler Brook Primary School
- Parson Cross CE Primary School
- Phillimore Community Primary School
- Pipworth Community Primary School
- Porter Croft CE Primary Academy
- Prince Edward Primary School
- Pye Bank CE Primary School
- Rainbow Forge Primary Academy
- Reignhead Primary School
- Rivelin Primary School
- Royd Infant School
- Sacred Heart RC School
- St Ann's RC Primary School
- St Catherine's RC Primary School
- St John Fisher RC Primary
- St Joseph's RC Primary School
- St Marie's RC School
- St Mary's CE Primary School
- St Mary's RC Primary School
- St Patrick's RC Voluntary Academy
- St Theresa's RC Primary School
- St Thomas More RC Primary
- St Thomas of Canterbury RC Primary School
- St Wilfrid's RC Primary School
- Sharrow School
- Shooter's Grove Primary School
- Shortbrook Primary School
- Southey Green Primary School
- Springfield Primary School
- Stannington Infant School
- Stocksbridge Infant School
- Stocksbridge Junior School
- Stradbroke Primary School
- Tinsley Meadows Primary School, Sheffield
- Totley All Saints CE Primary School
- Totley Primary School
- Walkley Primary School
- Watercliffe Meadow Community Primary School
- Waterthorpe Infant School
- Westways Primary School
- Wharncliffe Side Primary School
- Whiteways Primary School
- Wincobank Infant School
- Windmill Hill Primary School
- Wisewood Community Primary School
- Woodhouse West Primary School
- Woodlands Primary School
- Woodseats Primary School
- Woodthorpe Primary School
- Wybourn Community Primary School

=== Secondary schools ===
- All Saints Catholic High School
- Astrea Academy Sheffield
- The Birley Academy
- Bradfield School
- Chaucer School
- Ecclesfield School
- Fir Vale School
- Firth Park Academy
- Forge Valley School
- Handsworth Grange Community Sports College
- High Storrs School
- Hinde House 2-16 School
- King Ecgbert School
- King Edward VII School
- Meadowhead School
- Mercia School
- Newfield Secondary School
- Notre Dame Catholic High School
- Oasis Academy Don Valley
- Outwood Academy City
- Parkwood E-ACT Academy
- Sheffield Park Academy
- Sheffield Springs Academy
- Silverdale School
- Stocksbridge High School
- Tapton School
- UTC Sheffield City Centre
- UTC Sheffield Olympic Legacy Park
- Westfield School
- Yewlands Academy

=== Special and alternative schools ===
- Archdale School
- Becton School
- Bents Green School
- Discovery Academy
- Heritage Park School
- Holgate Meadows School
- Kenwood Academy
- Mossbrook School
- The Rowan School
- Seven Hills School
- Sheffield Inclusion Centre
- Talbot Specialist School
- Woolley Wood School

=== Further education ===
- Chapeltown Academy
- Longley Park Sixth Form
- Sheffield College

== Independent schools ==
=== Primary and preparatory schools ===
- Mylnhurst Preparatory School

=== Secondary and all-through schools ===
- Al-Mahad Al-Islami
- Bethany School
- Birkdale School
- Seraphic Academy
- Sheffield High School
- Westbourne School

=== Special and alternative schools ===
- Brantwood Specialist School
- Paces High Green School for Conductive Education
- Phoenix School of Therapeutic Education
