= North Devon District Council elections =

Local government elections in Devon, England

North Devon Council in Devon, England is elected every four years.

== Election results ==
Composition of the council
Year	Conservative	Liberal Democrats (Note: Includes totals for the predecessors of the Liberal Democrats, the Liberal Party and SDP (both of which participated in the Alliance).)	Labour	Green (Note: Includes totals for the predecessors of the Green Party of England and Wales, the Ecology Party and Green Party UK.)	UKIP	Independents & Others	Council control after election
Local government reorganisation; council established (44 seats)
1973	1	14	1	–	–	28	Independent
1976	5	12	0	0	–	27	Independent
1979	9	6	0	0	–	29	Independent
New ward boundaries (44 seats)
1983	9	8	1	0	–	26	Independent
1987	9	16	0	0	–	19	No overall control
1991	2	26	0	0	–	16	Liberal Democrats
1995	1	30	0	0	0	13	Liberal Democrats
1999	5	26	0	0	0	13	Liberal Democrats
New ward boundaries (43 seats)
2003	10	22	0	0	1	10	Liberal Democrats
2007	22	17	0	0	0	4	Conservative
2011	18	14	0	0	0	11	No overall control
2015	19	12	0	0	1	11	No overall control
New ward boundaries (42 seats)
2019	12	21	0	2	0	7	Liberal Democrats
2023	7	22	0	3	0	10	Liberal Democrats

== District result maps ==
2003 results map

2007 results map

2011 results map

2015 results map

2019 results map

2023 results map

== By-election results ==
=== 1995–1999 ===
Yeo By-Election 10 April 1997
Party	Candidate	Votes	%	±%
Liberal Democrats		591	73.8	
Conservative		131	16.4	
Labour		78	9.8	
Majority		460	57.4	
Turnout		800		
Liberal Democrats hold		Swing		

Ilfracombe Central By-Election 19 February 1998
Party	Candidate	Votes	%	±%
Independent		280	32.2	−6.6
Independent		220	25.3	+2.2
Labour		189	21.7	+21.7
Conservative		180	20.7	+20.7
Majority		60	6.9	
Turnout		869	32.0	
Independent hold		Swing		

=== 1999–2003 ===
Yeo By-Election 13 September 2001
Party	Candidate	Votes	%	±%
Liberal Democrats	Christopher Haywood	255	57.3	+1.7
Independent	Alfred Dibble	123	27.6	−3.4
Conservative	John Knill	67	15.1	+1.7
Majority		132	29.7	
Turnout		445	18.0	
Liberal Democrats hold		Swing		

=== 2003–2007 ===
Georgeham & Mortehoe By-Election 14 July 2005
Party	Candidate	Votes	%	±%
Liberal Democrats	Derrick Spear	384	43.5	−7.1
Conservative	Douglas Green	378	42.8	−6.6
Green	Michael Harrison	121	13.7	+13.7
Majority		6	0.7	
Turnout		883	28.0	
Liberal Democrats gain from Conservative		Swing		

Forches & Whiddon Valley By-Election 15 September 2005
Party	Candidate	Votes	%	±%
Liberal Democrats	Janet Carter	307	62.5	+27.0
Conservative	Simon Harvey	120	24.4	+4.5
Green	Earl Bramley-Howard	35	7.1	+7.1
Independent	Charles Piper	29	5.9	−38.7
Majority		187	38.1	
Turnout		491	15.0	
Liberal Democrats hold		Swing		

=== 2007–2011 ===
Witheridge By-Election 25 October 2007
Party	Candidate	Votes	%	±%
Conservative	Jeremy Yabsley	448	58.5	−0.2
Liberal Democrats	Kate Palmer	318	41.5	+0.2
Majority		130	17.0	
Turnout		766	42.0	
Conservative hold		Swing		

=== 2011–2015 ===
Fremington By-Election 11 August 2011
Party	Candidate	Votes	%	±%
Independent	Christopher Turner	501	46.9	
Conservative	John Gill	308	28.8	+16.2
Independent	Anthony Wood	196	18.3	
Green	Neil Basil	64	6.0	+6.0
Majority		193	18.1	
Turnout		1,069	30.0	−24.0
Independent hold		Swing		

=== 2015–2019 ===
Braunton East By-Election 2 November 2017
Party	Candidate	Votes	%	±%
Liberal Democrats	Derrick Spear	459	37.1	+3.0
Green	Brad Bunyard	387	31.3	+10.5
Conservative	Felix Milton	225	18.2	−17.5
Labour	Mark Cann	165	13.3	+6.3
Majority		72	5.8	
Turnout		1,236		
Liberal Democrats gain from Conservative		Swing		

Newport By-Election 7 December 2017
Party	Candidate	Votes	%	±%
Liberal Democrats	Caroline Leaver	390	38.8	+7.1
Conservative	Martin Kennaugh	373	37.1	−2.9
Green	Ricky Knight	159	15.8	−12.6
Labour	Siobhan Strode	83	8.3	+8.3
Majority		17	1.7	
Turnout		1,005		
Liberal Democrats gain from Conservative		Swing		

Fremington By-Election 28 June 2018
Party	Candidate	Votes	%	±%
Independent	Jayne Mackie	577	50.8	+50.8
Conservative	Jim Pilkington	356	31.3	+12.8
Liberal Democrats	Graham Lofthouse	119	10.5	+10.5
Labour	Blake Ladley	65	5.7	+5.7
Green	Lou Goodger	19	1.7	−8.0
Majority		221	19.5	
Turnout		1,136		
Independent hold		Swing		

=== 2019–2023 ===
Landkey By-Election 8 December 2022
Party	Candidate	Votes	%	±%
Liberal Democrats	Victoria Nel	374	42.7	+7.4
Conservative	David Hoare	237	27.1	−14.4
Green	Mark Haworth-Booth	228	26.1	+10.6
Labour	Nicholas Agnew	36	4.1	−3.6
Majority		137	15.7	
Turnout		875		
Liberal Democrats gain from Conservative		Swing		

=== 2023–2027 ===
Instow By-Election 9 January 2025
Party	Candidate	Votes	%	±%
Liberal Democrats	Becky Coombs	197	38.1	
Conservative	Christopher Hopkins	166	32.1	
Reform	Richard Booth	88	17.0	
Independent	Graham Payne	49	9.5	
Green	Howard Porter	17	3.3	
Majority		31	6.0	
Turnout		517		
Liberal Democrats gain from Conservative		Swing		

Barnstaple with Pilton By-Election 1 May 2025
Party	Candidate	Votes	%	±%
Liberal Democrats	Loki Dawson	716	40.2	
Reform	David Jarvis	581	32.6	
Green	Howard Porter	212	11.9	
Conservative	Lisa MacKenzie	208	11.7	
Labour	Rhys Jones	65	3.6	
Majority		135	7.6	
Turnout		1,789	29.17	
Liberal Democrats hold				

Barnstaple with Westacott By-Election 31 July 2025
Party	Candidate	Votes	%	±%
Liberal Democrats	Josh Rutty	505	40.5	
Reform	David Jarvis	383	30.7	
Conservative	Lisa Mackenzie	205	16.4	
Green	David Smale	154	12.3	
Majority		122	9.8	
Turnout		1,247		
Liberal Democrats hold				

Fremington By-Election 2 April 2026
Party	Candidate	Votes	%	±%
Liberal Democrats	Jayne Mackie	752	49.9	
Reform	Derek Sargent	496	32.9	
Green	Jules Credgington	131	8.7	
Conservative	Susan Kingdom	116	7.7	
Labour	Douglas McLynn	12	0.8	
Majority		256	17.0	
Turnout		1,507		
Liberal Democrats gain from Independent				
