= 2019 North Devon District Council election =

2019 UK local government election

← 2015	2 May 2019	2023 →

All 42 seats to North Devon District Council 22 seats needed for a majority

	First party	Second party
Party	Liberal Democrats	Conservative
Last election	12 seats, 24.7%	19 seats, 35.6%
Seats won	21	12
Seat change	▲9	▼4
Popular vote	17,760	12,098
Percentage	37.7%	25.7%
Swing	▲13.0%	▼9.9%
	Third party	Fourth party
Party	Independent	Green
Last election	11 seats, 16.0%	0 seats, 16.0%
Seats won	7	2
Seat change	▼4	▲2
Popular vote	5,868	7,216
Percentage	12.4%	15.3%
Swing	▼3.6%	▼0.7%
- Winner of each seat at the 2019 North Devon District Council election
Council control before election
No overall control
Council control after election
Liberal Democrats

The 2019 North Devon District Council election took place on 2 May 2019 to elect members of North Devon District Council in England. This was on the same day as other local elections. The whole council was up for election on new boundaries.

== Summary ==
=== Election result ===
2019 North Devon District Council election
Party	Candidates	Seats	Gains	Losses	Net gain/loss	Seats %	Votes %	Votes	+/−
Liberal Democrats	38	21	N/A	N/A	▲9	50.0	37.7	17,760	+13.0
Conservative	32	12	N/A	N/A	▼7	26.2	25.7	12,098	–9.9
Independent	10	7	N/A	N/A	▼4	16.7	12.4	5,868	–3.6
Green	33	2	N/A	N/A	▲2	4.8	15.3	7,216	–0.7
Labour	24	0	N/A	N/A	Steady	0.0	6.6	3,089	+3.9
UKIP	5	0	N/A	N/A	▼1	0.0	2.4	1,109	–2.0

== Ward results ==
=== Barnstaple Central ===
Barnstaple Central
Party	Candidate	Votes	%	±%
Green	Robbie Mack	264	44.9	
Liberal Democrats	Ian Williams	181	30.8	
Conservative	Felix Milton	93	15.8	
Labour	Roy Tomlinson	50	8.5	
Majority		83	14.1	
Turnout		590	31.33	
Green win (new seat)				

=== Barnstaple with Pilton ===
Barnstaple with Pilton
Party	Candidate	Votes	%	±%
Liberal Democrats	Ian Roome*	1,023	57.2	
Liberal Democrats	Jo Orange	835	46.6	
Liberal Democrats	Mel Lovering	793	44.3	
Green	L'Anne Knight	391	21.8	
Conservative	William Major	343	19.2	
Labour	Helen Cooper	289	16.1	
Green	Lucie Redwood	262	14.6	
Green	Lou Goodger	243	13.6	
Labour	Valerie Main	222	12.4	
Majority		402	22.5	
Turnout		1,790	30.62	
Liberal Democrats win (new seat)				
Liberal Democrats win (new seat)				
Liberal Democrats win (new seat)				

=== Barnstaple with Westacott ===
Barnstaple with Westacott
Party	Candidate	Votes	%	±%
Liberal Democrats	Julie Hunt*	679	44.8	
Liberal Democrats	Jeremy Phillips	608	40.1	
Liberal Democrats	Nicola Topham	488	32.2	
Conservative	David Hoare	394	26.0	
UKIP	Andy Norden	368	24.3	
Green	Matt Chamings	311	20.5	
Green	Tom Gray	247	16.3	
Green	Jane Basil	207	13.7	
Labour	Martin Robathan	206	13.6	
Majority		94	6.2	
Turnout		1,515	27.60	
Liberal Democrats win (new seat)				
Liberal Democrats win (new seat)				
Liberal Democrats win (new seat)				

=== Bickington ===
Bickington
Party	Candidate	Votes	%	±%
Liberal Democrats	Will Topps	679	41.6	
Liberal Democrats	Joy Cann*	658	40.3	
Liberal Democrats	Helen Walker	593	36.3	
Conservative	Rodney Cann*	525	32.1	
Conservative	Jackie Flynn*	464	28.4	
Conservative	Brian Hockin	440	26.9	
UKIP	Ken Praill	288	17.6	
Green	Amy Sherwin	232	14.2	
Labour	Blake Ladley	193	11.8	
Majority		68	4.2	
Turnout		1,633	34.33	
Liberal Democrats win (new seat)				
Liberal Democrats win (new seat)				
Liberal Democrats win (new seat)				

=== Bishops Nympton ===
Bishops Nympton
Party	Candidate	Votes	%	±%
Independent	Eric Ley*	624	72.1	
Liberal Democrats	Ros Armstrong	138	15.9	
Green	Ian Horsnell	104	12.0	
Majority		486	56.2	
Turnout		866	47.55	
Independent win (new seat)				

=== Bratton Fleming ===
Bratton Fleming
Party	Candidate	Votes	%	±%
Independent	Malcolm Prowse*	600	71.7	
Green	Ian Godfrey	159	19.0	
Labour	Lesley McLean	78	9.3	
Majority		441	52.7	
Turnout		837	44.95	
Independent win (new seat)				

=== Braunton East ===
Braunton East
Party	Candidate	Votes	%	±%
Liberal Democrats	Liz Spear	510	33.7	
Liberal Democrats	Derrick Spear*	509	33.6	
Green	Liz Wood	462	30.5	
Green	David Relph	455	30.1	
Conservative	Louis Seymour	385	25.4	
Conservative	Christopher Guyver	323	21.3	
Labour	Valerie Cann	148	9.8	
Labour	Nick Agnew	112	7.4	
Majority		47	3.1	
Turnout		1,513	40.08	
Liberal Democrats win (new seat)				
Liberal Democrats win (new seat)				

=== Braunton West & Georgeham ===
Braunton West & Georgeham
Party	Candidate	Votes	%	±%
Conservative	Jasmine Chesters*	451	30.8	
Conservative	Pat Barker*	449	30.6	
Liberal Democrats	Adam Bradford*	448	30.6	
Liberal Democrats	Margeurite Shapland	408	27.8	
Green	Brad Bunyard	338	23.1	
Labour	Mark Cann	224	15.3	
Green	Tamzin Pollard	203	13.9	
Labour	Tamsin Higgs	194	13.2	
Majority		1	0.0	
Turnout		1,465	39.15	
Conservative win (new seat)				
Conservative win (new seat)				

=== Chittlehampton ===
Chittlehampton
Party	Candidate	Votes	%	±%
Conservative	Ray Jenkins	323	40.0	
Green	Neil Basil	248	30.7	
Liberal Democrats	Victoria Nel	221	27.4	
Labour	Cecily Blyther	16	2.0	
Majority		75	9.3	
Turnout		810	41.44	
Conservative win (new seat)				

The election in Chittlehampton ward (1 councillor) was postponed due to the death of independent candidate Walter White.

=== Chulmleigh ===
Chulmleigh
Party	Candidate	Votes	%	±%
Liberal Democrats	Kevin Davies	420	51.9	
Conservative	Sue Croft*	329	40.6	
Labour	Harry Ellis	61	7.5	
Majority		91	11.3	
Turnout		962	47.13	
Liberal Democrats win (new seat)				

=== Combe Martin ===
Combe Martin
Party	Candidate	Votes	%	±%
Independent	Yvette Gubb*	823	85.6	
Green	Robert Cornish	90	9.4	
Labour	John Hales	48	5.0	
Majority		733	76.2	
Turnout			45.32	
Independent win (new seat)				

=== Fremington ===
Fremington
Party	Candidate	Votes	%	±%
Independent	Frank Biederman*	1,087	66.2	
Independent	Jayne Mackie*	743	45.3	
Independent	Jim Bell	430	26.2	
Conservative	Duncan Jack	237	14.4	
Liberal Democrats	Peter Thorn	175	10.7	
Green	Colin Jacob	91	5.5	
Green	Steve Jarvis	91	5.5	
Labour	Doug McLynn	79	4.8	
Majority		313	19.1	
Turnout		1,641	41.79	
Independent win (new seat)				

=== Heanton Punchardon ===
Heanton Punchardon
Party	Candidate	Votes	%	±%
Conservative	Andrea Davis*	261	50.7	
Green	Ricky Knight	80	15.5	
UKIP	Richard Allen	69	13.4	
Liberal Democrats	Jake Slee	61	11.8	
Labour	Zahra Bedford-Higgs	44	8.5	
Majority		181	35.2	
Turnout		515	31.16	
Conservative win (new seat)				

=== Ilfracombe East ===
Ilfracombe East
Party	Candidate	Votes	%	±%
Conservative	Daniel Turton	620	37.4	
Conservative	Paul Crabb*	593	35.8	
Independent	Jim Campbell*	509	30.7	
Liberal Democrats	June Williams	457	27.6	
Conservative	Paul Yabsley	323	19.5	
Green	Frank Pearson	312	18.8	
Liberal Democrats	Kit Leck	307	18.5	
Green	Linda Mack	243	14.7	
Green	Oliver Tooley	240	14.5	
Liberal Democrats	Adrian Bryant	227	13.7	
UKIP	Simon Palmer	218	13.1	
Labour	Wendy Smith	204	12.3	
Majority		52	3.1	
Turnout		1,658	32.20	
Conservative win (new seat)				
Conservative win (new seat)				
Independent win (new seat)				

=== Ilfracombe West ===
Ilfracombe West
Party	Candidate	Votes	%	±%
Liberal Democrats	Geoff Fowler*	490	41.1	
Green	Netti Pearson	441	37.0	
Conservative	Ian Meadlarkin*	316	26.5	
Liberal Democrats	Pat Coates	291	24.4	
Green	Kyle Chivers	282	23.7	
UKIP	Stuart Robertson	166	13.9	
Labour	Patrick Kelly	141	11.8	
Majority		125	10.5	
Turnout		1,191	34.90	
Liberal Democrats win (new seat)				
Green win (new seat)				

=== Instow ===
Instow
Party	Candidate	Votes	%	±%
Conservative	Selaine Saxby	319	43.0	
Liberal Democrats	Rod Teasdale	273	36.8	
Green	Christine Basil	120	16.2	
Labour	Madeleine Cooke	29	3.9	
Majority		46	6.2	
Turnout		741	42.01	
Conservative win (new seat)				

=== Landkey ===
Landkey
Party	Candidate	Votes	%	±%
Conservative	Glyn Lane*	558	40.7	
Conservative	David Luggar*	533	38.9	
Liberal Democrats	Victoria Nel	475	34.7	
Liberal Democrats	Peter Leaver	453	33.1	
Green	Josie Knight	208	15.2	
Green	Mark Haworth-Booth	188	13.7	
Labour	Ian Wood	103	7.5	
Majority		58	4.2	
Turnout		1,370	41.29	
Conservative win (new seat)				
Conservative win (new seat)				

=== Lynton & Lynmouth ===
Lynton & Lynmouth
Party	Candidate	Votes	%	±%
Independent	John Patrinos*	475	59.4	
Independent	Philip Hawkins	175	21.9	
Conservative	Astra Fletcher	149	18.6	
Majority		300	37.5	
Turnout		799	44.73	
Independent win (new seat)				

=== Marwood ===
Marwood
Party	Candidate	Votes	%	±%
Liberal Democrats	Joe Tucker*	430	55.1	
Conservative	Freddy Harper-Davis	243	31.2	
Green	Shona Davis	107	13.7	
Majority		187	23.9	
Turnout		780	41.35	
Liberal Democrats win (new seat)				

=== Mortehoe ===
Mortehoe
Party	Candidate	Votes	%	±%
Liberal Democrats	Malcolm Wilkinson*	404	65.4	
Conservative	David Barker	150	24.3	
Labour	Oliver Bell	64	10.4	
Majority		254	41.1	
Turnout		618	36.32	
Liberal Democrats win (new seat)				

=== Newport ===
Newport
Party	Candidate	Votes	%	±%
Liberal Democrats	Caroline Leaver*	732	53.4	
Liberal Democrats	Louisa York	702	51.2	
Conservative	Martin Kennaugh	414	30.2	
Green	Neil Basil	206	15.0	
Green	Rosie Haworth-Booth	188	13.7	
Labour	Finola O'Neill	124	9.1	
Majority		288	21.0	
Turnout		1,370	35.19	
Liberal Democrats win (new seat)				
Liberal Democrats win (new seat)				

=== North Molton ===
North Molton
Party	Candidate	Votes	%	±%
Conservative	Liz Bulled	491	71.4	
Liberal Democrats	Gabi Marchewka	197	28.6	
Majority		294	42.8	
Turnout		688	40.68	
Conservative win (new seat)				

=== Roundswell ===
Roundswell
Party	Candidate	Votes	%	±%
Liberal Democrats	David Knight	549	53.1	
Liberal Democrats	Graham Lofthouse	494	47.8	
Conservative	Jennifer Ferries	369	35.7	
Conservative	Jim Pilkington	330	31.9	
Green	David Smith	127	12.3	
Labour	Ian Crawford	97	9.4	
Majority		125	12.1	
Turnout		1,033	37.89	
Liberal Democrats win (new seat)				
Liberal Democrats win (new seat)				

=== South Molton ===
South Molton
Party	Candidate	Votes	%	±%
Liberal Democrats	David Worden*	807	45.3	
Liberal Democrats	Matthew Bushell*	657	36.9	
Conservative	Paul Henderson	637	35.8	
Liberal Democrats	Jacqui Footman	489	27.5	
Conservative	Emily Croft	468	26.3	
Conservative	Terry King	413	23.2	
Independent	Marc Cornelius	402	22.6	
Labour	Steven Hinchliffe	236	13.3	
Green	Gill Saunders	202	11.3	
Labour	Sarah Nicholas	143	8.0	
Majority		148	8.3	
Turnout		1,780	41.43	
Liberal Democrats win (new seat)				
Liberal Democrats win (new seat)				
Conservative win (new seat)				

=== Witheridge ===
Witheridge
Party	Candidate	Votes	%	±%
Conservative	Jeremy Yabsley*	478	66.4	
Green	Woody Fox	122	16.9	
Liberal Democrats	David Clayton	120	16.7	
Majority		356	49.5	
Turnout		722	41.56	
Conservative win (new seat)				

== By-elections ==
Landkey, 8/12/2022
Party	Candidate	Votes	%	±%
Liberal Democrats	Victoria Nel	374	42.7	+8.0
Conservative	David Hoare	237	27.1	−11.8
Green	Mark Haworth-Booth	228	26.1	+12.4
Labour	Nicholas Agnew	36	4.1	−3.4
Majority		137	15.6	
Turnout		875	25.88	−15.41
Liberal Democrats gain from Conservative		Swing		
