= UTC Sheffield =

UTC Sheffield may refer to one of two university technical colleges located in the city of Sheffield, South Yorkshire:

- UTC Sheffield City Centre, opened in 2013 and known until 2016 as UTC Sheffield
- UTC Sheffield Olympic Legacy Park, opened in 2016
