= 2023 North Devon District Council election =

Local election in England

| ← 2019 | 4 May 2023 | 2027 → |

All 42 seats to North Devon District Council 22 seats needed for a majority
- Turnout: 32.75%

| | First party | Second party |
|---|---|---|
| Leader | David Worden |
| Party | Liberal Democrats | Independent |
| Last election | 21 seats, 37.7% | 7 seats, 12.4% |
| Seats before | 22 | 9 (Note: Of the nine independent councillors prior to the election, seven formed the "Independents Group" led by Malcolm Prowse and two (both former Conservatives) formed the "North Devon Independent Group" led by Glyn Lane.) |
| Seats after | 22 | 10 |
| Seat change | ▲1 | ▲3 |
| Popular vote | 17,501 | 8,158 |
| Percentage | 40.49% | 18.87% |
| Swing | ▲2.8% | ▲9.0% |
| | Third party | Fourth party |
| Leader | Jeremy Yabsley | Netti Pearson |
| Party | Conservative | Green |
| Last election | 12 seats, 25.7% | 2 seats, 15.3% |
| Seats before | 9 | 2 |
| Seats after | 7 | 3 |
| Seat change | ▼5 | ▲1 |
| Popular vote | 8,041 | 6,508 |
| Percentage | 18.60% | 15.06% |
| Swing | ▼7.1% | ▼0.2% |
- Winner of each seat at the 2023 North Devon District Council election
Leader before election
David Worden
Liberal Democrats
Leader after election
Ian Roome
Liberal Democrats

The 2023 North Devon District Council election took place on 4 May 2023 to elect members of North Devon District Council in England. This was on the same day as other local elections in England.

The Liberal Democrats retained control of the council.

== Overview ==
At the last elections in 2019 the Liberal Democrats won exactly half the seats, leaving the council in no overall control. They took control in December 2022 through winning a by-election.

The Liberal Democrats retained their majority on the council, taking 22 of the 42 seats. Following the election they changed party leader, with Ian Roome being appointed the new leader of the council at the subsequent annual council meeting on 18 May 2023. After the election the independent councillors and Greens formed a single group called the North Devon Independent Group led by independent councillor Malcolm Prowse. The Conservatives' leader before the election, Jeremy Yabsley, did not stand for re-election. They chose Paul Crabb as their new leader after the election.

== Results summary ==

2023 North Devon District Council election
| Party | Candidates | Seats | Gains | Losses | Net gain/loss | Seats % | Votes % | Votes | +/− |
|---|---|---|---|---|---|---|---|---|---|
| Liberal Democrats | 34 | 22 | 3 | 2 | ▲1 | 54.76 | 40.49 | 17,501 | ▲2.8 |
| Independent | 22 | 10 | 2 | 2 | Steady | 21.43 | 18.87 | 8,158 | ▲9.0 |
| Conservative | 24 | 7 | 1 | 3 | ▼2 | 16.67 | 18.60 | 8,041 | ▼7.1 |
| Green | 25 | 3 | 2 | 1 | ▲1 | 7.14 | 15.06 | 6,508 | ▼0.2 |
| Labour | 18 | 0 | 0 | 0 | Steady | 0.00 | 6.95 | 3,003 | ▲0.4 |
| Communist | 1 | 0 | 0 | 0 | Steady | 0.00 | 0.04 | 15 | ▲0.04 |

== Ward results ==
Sitting councillors are marked with an asterisk (*).

=== Barnstaple Central ===
Barnstaple Central
| Party | Candidate | Votes | % | ±% |
|---|---|---|---|---|
| Liberal Democrats | Syed Jusef | 273 | 53.53 | ▲22.7 |
| Conservative | Reginald Howe | 92 | 18.04 | ▲2.2 |
| Green | Howard Porter | 86 | 16.86 | ▼28.0 |
| Labour | Roy Tomlinson | 28 | 5.49 | ▼3.0 |
| Independent | Bobby Burden-Brewer | 16 | 3.14 | N/A |
| Communist | Gerard Sables | 15 | 2.94 | N/A |
| Majority | | | | |
| Turnout | | 515 | 25.71 | ▼5.62 |
| Liberal Democrats gain from Green | | Swing | | |

=== Barnstaple with Pilton ===
Barnstaple with Pilton (3 seats)
| Party | Candidate | Votes | % | ±% |
|---|---|---|---|---|
| Liberal Democrats | Ian Roome* | 1,037 | 64.09 | ▲6.9 |
| Liberal Democrats | Mel Lovering* | 845 | 52.22 | ▲7.9 |
| Liberal Democrats | Jo Orange* | 766 | 47.34 | ▲0.7 |
| Green | Robbie Mack | 344 | 21.26 | ▲6.7 |
| Green | Lou Goodger | 333 | 20.58 | ▲7.0 |
| Green | L'Anne Knight | 328 | 20.27 | ▼1.5 |
| Conservative | Francesca McKeever | 300 | 18.54 | ▼0.7 |
| Labour | Finola O'Neill | 206 | 12.73 | ▼3.4 |
| Turnout | | 1,618 | 27.04 | ▼3.58 |
| Liberal Democrats hold | | | | |
| Liberal Democrats hold | | | | |
| Liberal Democrats hold | | | | |

=== Barnstaple with Westacott ===
Barnstaple with Westacott (3 seats)
| Party | Candidate | Votes | % | ±% |
|---|---|---|---|---|
| Liberal Democrats | Peter Leaver | 712 | 52.74 | ▲7.9 |
| Liberal Democrats | David Clayton | 705 | 52.22 | ▲12.1 |
| Liberal Democrats | Katrina Stevenson | 690 | 51.11 | ▲18.9 |
| Conservative | Lisa MacKenzie | 401 | 29.70 | ▲3.7 |
| Green | Steven White | 263 | 19.48 | ▼1.0 |
| Independent | John Carter | 206 | 15.26 | N/A |
| Independent | Val Monk | 205 | 15.19 | N/A |
| Labour | Helen Marini | 196 | 14.52 | ▲1.9 |
| Turnout | | 1,350 | 24.14 | ▼3.46 |
| Liberal Democrats hold | | | | |
| Liberal Democrats hold | | | | |
| Liberal Democrats hold | | | | |

=== Bickington ===
Bickington (3 seats)
| Party | Candidate | Votes | % | ±% |
|---|---|---|---|---|
| Liberal Democrats | Joy Cann* | 810 | 56.09 | ▲15.8 |
| Liberal Democrats | Will Topps* | 778 | 53.88 | ▲13.6 |
| Liberal Democrats | Helen Walker* | 741 | 51.32 | ▲15.0 |
| Conservative | Gary Beglin | 460 | 31.86 | ▼0.2 |
| Conservative | Chris Hopkins | 441 | 30.54 | ▲2.1 |
| Green | Christine Basil | 361 | 25.00 | ▲10.8 |
| Turnout | | 1,444 | 26.41 | ▼7.92 |
| Liberal Democrats hold | | | | |
| Liberal Democrats hold | | | | |
| Liberal Democrats hold | | | | |

=== Bishops Nympton ===
Bishops Nympton
| Party | Candidate | Votes | % | ±% |
|---|---|---|---|---|
| Independent | Robin Milton | 495 | 68.66 | ▼5.4 |
| Green | Nicholas Withers | 131 | 18.17 | ▲8.2 |
| Liberal Democrats | Ashraf Shah | 95 | 13.18 | ▼2.7 |
| Majority | | 364 | 50.49 | ▼5.71 |
| Turnout | | 721 | 38.10 | ▼9.45 |
| Independent hold | | Swing | | |

=== Bratton Fleming ===
Bratton Fleming
| Party | Candidate | Votes | % | ±% |
|---|---|---|---|---|
| Independent | Malcolm Prowse* | 485 | 62.02 | ▼9.7 |
| Green | Ian Godfrey | 112 | 14.32 | ▼4.7 |
| Conservative | Dominic Chugg | 102 | 13.04 | N/A |
| Labour | Marian Mason | 81 | 10.36 | ▲1.1 |
| Majority | | 373 | 47.70 | ▼5.0 |
| Turnout | | 782 | 40.49 | ▼4.46 |
| Independent hold | | Swing | | |

=== Braunton East ===
Braunton East (2 seats)
| Party | Candidate | Votes | % | ±% |
|---|---|---|---|---|
| Liberal Democrats | Liz Spear* | 664 | 43.51 | ▲9.8 |
| Liberal Democrats | Graham Bell | 642 | 42.07 | ▲8.5 |
| Green | David Relph | 483 | 31.65 | ▲1.7 |
| Green | Cas Lay | 390 | 25.56 | ▼4.9 |
| Independent | Adrian Bryant | 272 | 17.82 | N/A |
| Labour | Nicholas Agnew | 174 | 11.40 | ▲4.0 |
| Turnout | | 1,526 | 39.85 | ▼0.23 |
| Liberal Democrats hold | | | | |
| Liberal Democrats hold | | | | |

=== Braunton West & Georgeham ===
Braunton West & Georgeham (2 seats)
| Party | Candidate | Votes | % | ±% |
|---|---|---|---|---|
| Independent | Simon Maddocks | 659 | 42.27 | N/A |
| Conservative | Pru Maskell | 534 | 34.25 | ▲3.7 |
| Liberal Democrats | Tristan Clarkson | 371 | 23.80 | ▼6.8 |
| Liberal Democrats | Julian Cox | 342 | 21.94 | ▼5.9 |
| Labour | Mark Cann | 290 | 18.60 | ▲3.3 |
| Independent | Jasmine Chesters* (a) | 260 | 16.68 | ▼14.1 |
| Green | Brett Parker | 244 | 15.65 | ▼7.4 |
| Turnout | | 1,559 | 41.49 | ▲2.34 |
| Independent gain from Independent | | Swing | | |
| Conservative hold | | Swing | | |

- (a) Jasmine Chesters was elected in 2019 as a Conservative.

=== Chittlehampton ===
Chittlehampton
| Party | Candidate | Votes | % | ±% |
|---|---|---|---|---|
| Conservative | Susan Whitehead | 371 | 47.63 | ▲7.6 |
| Liberal Democrats | Jamie Burn | 255 | 32.73 | ▲5.3 |
| Green | Neil Basil | 109 | 13.99 | ▼16.7 |
| Labour | Cecily Blyther | 52 | 6.68 | ▲4.7 |
| Majority | | 116 | 14.9 | ▲5.6 |
| Turnout | | 779 | 38.78 | ▼0.37 |
| Conservative hold | | Swing | | |

=== Chulmleigh ===
Chulmleigh
| Party | Candidate | Votes | % | ±% |
|---|---|---|---|---|
| Liberal Democrats | Kevin Davies* | 498 | 63.36 | ▲12.5 |
| Conservative | Judith Lee | 232 | 29.52 | ▼11.1 |
| Labour | Harry Ellis | 54 | 6.87 | ▼0.6 |
| Majority | | 266 | 33.84 | ▲22.5 |
| Turnout | | 786 | 42.73 | ▲1.60 |
| Liberal Democrats hold | | Swing | | |

=== Combe Martin ===
Combe Martin
| Party | Candidate | Votes | % | ±% |
|---|---|---|---|---|
| Independent | Brian Lethaby | 382 | 52.04 | ▼33.6 |
| Conservative | Lawrence Irving | 239 | 32.56 | N/A |
| Green | Robert Cornish | 113 | 15.40 | ▲6.0 |
| Majority | | 143 | 19.48 | ▼56.7 |
| Turnout | | 740 | 35.05 | ▼10.27 |
| Independent hold | | Swing | | |

=== Fremington ===
Fremington (2 seats)
| Party | Candidate | Votes | % | ±% |
|---|---|---|---|---|
| Independent | Frank Biederman* | 1,223 | 72.54 | ▲6.3 |
| Independent | Neil Denton | 705 | 41.82 | N/A |
| Independent | Jim Bell | 473 | 28.06 | ▲1.9 |
| Independent | Bowser Harris | 233 | 13.82 | N/A |
| Conservative | Jack Juby | 207 | 12.28 | ▼2.1 |
| Labour | Doug McLynn | 147 | 8.72 | ▲3.9 |
| Liberal Democrats | Keith York | 128 | 7.59 | ▼3.1 |
| Turnout | | 1,688 | 38.69 | ▼3.10 |
| Independent hold | | | | |
| Independent hold | | | | |

=== Heanton Punchardon ===
Heanton Punchardon
| Party | Candidate | Votes | % | ±% |
|---|---|---|---|---|
| Green | Ricky Knight | 275 | 59.40 | ▲43.9 |
| Liberal Democrats | Dennis Jenkins | 113 | 24.41 | ▲12.6 |
| Labour | Valerie Cann | 75 | 16.20 | ▲7.7 |
| Majority | | 162 | 34.99 | ▼0.2 |
| Turnout | | 479 | 25.67 | ▼5.49 |
| Green gain from Conservative | | Swing | | |

=== Ilfracombe East ===
Ilfracombe East (3 seats)
| Party | Candidate | Votes | % | ±% |
|---|---|---|---|---|
| Liberal Democrats | June Williams | 718 | 52.07 | ▲24.5 |
| Conservative | Paul Crabb* | 674 | 48.88 | ▲13.1 |
| Conservative | Daniel Turton* | 673 | 48.80 | ▲11.4 |
| Labour | Teresa Elliott | 645 | 46.77 | ▲34.5 |
| Green | Linda Mack | 572 | 41.48 | ▲26.8 |
| Turnout | | 1,387 | 27.00 | ▼5.2 |
| Liberal Democrats gain from Independent | | Swing | | |
| Conservative hold | | Swing | | |
| Conservative hold | | Swing | | |

=== Ilfracombe West ===
Ilfracombe West (2 seats)
| Party | Candidate | Votes | % | ±% |
|---|---|---|---|---|
| Green | Sara Wilson | 524 | 48.43 | ▲11.4 |
| Conservative | Jonathan Quinn | 432 | 39.93 | ▲13.5 |
| Conservative | Mark Fay | 365 | 33.73 | N/A |
| Labour | Toby Ebert | 337 | 31.15 | ▲19.4 |
| Liberal Democrats | Dave Baxter | 315 | 29.11 | ▼12.0 |
| Turnout | | 1,084 | 30.96 | ▼1.2 |
| Green hold | | Swing | | |
| Conservative gain from Liberal Democrats | | Swing | | |

=== Instow ===
Instow
| Party | Candidate | Votes | % | ±% |
|---|---|---|---|---|
| Conservative | Lucinda Renshaw | 217 | 30.27 | ▼12.7 |
| Independent | Becky Coombs | 188 | 26.22 | N/A |
| Independent | Joanne Bell | 114 | 15.90 | N/A |
| Green | Emily Herbert | 103 | 14.37 | ▼1.8 |
| Labour | Brendon O'Brien | 66 | 9.21 | ▲5.3 |
| Independent | Nicholas Arthur | 29 | 4.04 | N/A |
| Majority | | 29 | 4.05 | ▼2.1 |
| Turnout | | 724 | 38.53 | ▼3.48 |
| Conservative hold | | Swing | | |

=== Landkey ===
Landkey (2 seats)
| Party | Candidate | Votes | % | ±% |
|---|---|---|---|---|
| Independent | Glyn Lane* (a) | 498 | 41.26 | ▲0.6 |
| Green | Mark Haworth-Booth | 454 | 37.61 | ▲23.9 |
| Liberal Democrats | Victoria Nel* | 443 | 36.70 | ▲2.0 |
| Liberal Democrats | Robert Janeiro | 238 | 19.72 | ▼13.4 |
| Green | Lucie Redwood | 196 | 16.24 | ▲1.0 |
| Labour | Tamsin Higgs | 75 | 6.21 | ▼1.3 |
| Turnout | | 1,218 | 32.87 | ▼8.42 |
| Independent hold | | | | |
| Green gain from Conservative | | | | |

- (a) : Glyn Lane was elected as Conservative in 2019.

=== Lynton & Lynmouth ===
Lynton & Lynmouth
| Party | Candidate | Votes | % | ±% |
|---|---|---|---|---|
| Independent | John Patrinos* | 363 | 56.28 | ▼3.1 |
| Conservative | Arthur Atherton | 201 | 31.16 | ▲12.6 |
| Liberal Democrats | Damian Owen | 81 | 12.56 | N/A |
| Majority | | 162 | 25.12 | ▼12.4 |
| Turnout | | 648 | 35.92 | ▼8.81 |
| Independent hold | | Swing | | |

=== Marwood ===
Marwood
| Party | Candidate | Votes | % | ±% |
|---|---|---|---|---|
| Liberal Democrats | Julie Hunt | Unopposed | | |
| Liberal Democrats hold | | | | |

=== Mortehoe ===
Mortehoe
| Party | Candidate | Votes | % | ±% |
|---|---|---|---|---|
| Liberal Democrats | Malcolm Wilkinson* | 309 | 56.49 | ▼8.9 |
| Conservative | Sue Kingdom | 130 | 23.77 | ▼0.5 |
| Green | Shona Davis | 58 | 10.60 | n/a |
| Labour | Oliver Bell | 50 | 9.14 | ▼1.3 |
| Majority | | 179 | 32.72 | ▼8.4 |
| Turnout | | 550 | 31.70 | ▼4.62 |
| Liberal Democrats hold | | Swing | | |

=== Newport ===
Newport (2 seats)
| Party | Candidate | Votes | % | ±% |
|---|---|---|---|---|
| Liberal Democrats | Caroline Leaver* | 798 | 61.62 | ▲8.2 |
| Liberal Democrats | Louisa York* | 654 | 50.50 | ▼0.7 |
| Conservative | David Hoare (Con) | 352 | 27.18 | ▼3.0 |
| Green | Matt Chamings | 245 | 18.92 | ▲3.9 |
| Green | Rosie Haworth-Booth | 150 | 11.58 | ▼2.1 |
| Labour | Alison Stringer | 140 | 10.81 | ▲1.7 |
| Turnout | | 1,304 | 32.76 | ▼2.43 |
| Liberal Democrats hold | | | | |
| Liberal Democrats hold | | | | |

=== North Molton ===
North Molton
| Party | Candidate | Votes | % | ±% |
|---|---|---|---|---|
| Conservative | Liz Bulled* | 407 | 59.33 | ▼12.1 |
| Liberal Democrats | Gabi Marchewka | 145 | 21.14 | ▼7.5 |
| Green | Chris Barraclough | 134 | 19.53 | n/a |
| Majority | | 262 | 38.14 | ▼4.7 |
| Turnout | | 688 | 38.71 | ▼1.97 |
| Conservative hold | | Swing | | |

=== Roundswell ===
Roundswell (2 seats)
| Party | Candidate | Votes | % | ±% |
|---|---|---|---|---|
| Liberal Democrats | David Knight* | 656 | 57.44 | ▲4.3 |
| Liberal Democrats | Christopher Norman | 590 | 51.66 | ▲3.9 |
| Conservative | Stephen Burridge | 323 | 28.28 | ▼7.5 |
| Conservative | Simon Randall | 270 | 23.64 | ▼8.3 |
| Independent | Alan Rennles (a) | 239 | 20.93 | n/a |
| Labour | Ian Crawford | 98 | 8.58 | ▼0.8 |
| Turnout | | 1,148 | 36.35 | ▼1.54 |
| Liberal Democrats hold | | | | |
| Liberal Democrats hold | | | | |

- (a) : Alan Rennles was the mayor of Barnstaple until 2023, as a member of the Liberal Democrats.

=== South Molton ===
South Molton (3 seats)
| Party | Candidate | Votes | % | ±% |
|---|---|---|---|---|
| Liberal Democrats | David Worden* | 916 | 65.52 | ▲20.3 |
| Liberal Democrats | Peter Bishop | 600 | 42.92 | ▲15.4 |
| Independent | Matthew Bushell* (a) | 573 | 40.99 | ▲4.1 |
| Independent | Paul Henderson* (b) | 438 | 31.33 | ▼5.8 |
| Conservative | Vanessa Burnham | 337 | 24.11 | ▼2.2 |
| Labour | Steven Hinchliffe | 289 | 20.67 | ▲7.4 |
| Conservative | Natasha Vukic | 281 | 20.10 | ▼3.2 |
| Green | Gill Saunders | 257 | 18.38 | ▲7.1 |
| Independent | Marc Cornelius | 245 | 17.53 | ▼5.1 |
| Turnout | | 1,495 | 30.98 | ▼10.45 |
| Liberal Democrats hold | | | | |
| Liberal Democrats hold | | | | |
| Independent hold | | | | |

- (a) : Matthew Bushell was elected in 2019 for the Liberal Democrats.
- (b) : Paul Henderson was elected in 2019 for the Conservative Party.

=== Witheridge ===
Witheridge
| Party | Candidate | Votes | % | ±% |
|---|---|---|---|---|
| Independent | Peter Jones | 430 | 63.89 | n/a |
| Green | Woody Fox | 243 | 36.11 | ▲19.2 |
| Majority | | 187 | 27.78 | ▼21.7 |
| Turnout | | 681 | 35.47 | ▼6.09 |
| Independent gain from Conservative | | Swing | | |

== By-elections ==
=== Instow, 9 January 2025 ===
Instow
| Party | Candidate | Votes | % | ±% |
|---|---|---|---|---|
| Liberal Democrats | Becky Coombs | 197 | 38.10 | ▲11.88 |
| Conservative | Christopher Hopkins | 166 | 32.11 | ▼1.84 |
| Reform UK | Richard Booth | 88 | 17.02 | N/A |
| Independent | Graham Payne | 49 | 9.48 | N/A |
| Green | Howard Porter | 17 | 3.29 | ▼11.08 |
| Majority | | 31 | 5.99 | |
| Turnout | | 517 | 27.37 | ▼11.16 |
| Liberal Democrats gain from Conservative | | Swing | | |

=== Barnstaple with Pilton, 1 May 2025 ===
Barnstaple with Pilton, By-Election 1 May 2025
| Party | Candidate | Votes | % | ±% |
|---|---|---|---|---|
| Liberal Democrats | Loki Gareth Phillip Dawson | 716 | 40.2 | |
| Reform UK | David Ian Jarvis | 581 | 32.6 | |
| Green | Howard Porter | 212 | 11.9 | |
| Conservative | Lisa Jayne MacKenzie | 208 | 11.7 | |
| Labour | Rhys Daniel Jones | 65 | 3.6 | |
| Majority | | 135 | 7.6 | |
| Turnout | | 1,789 | 29.17 | |
| Liberal Democrats hold | | | | |

=== Barnstaple with Westacott ===
Barnstaple with Westacott by-election: 31 July 2025
| Party | Candidate | Votes | % | ±% |
|---|---|---|---|---|
| Liberal Democrats | Josh Rutty | 505 | 40.5 | +0.5 |
| Reform UK | David Jarvis | 383 | 30.7 | N/A |
| Conservative | Lisa Mackenzie | 205 | 16.4 | –6.2 |
| Green | David Smale | 154 | 12.3 | –2.5 |
| Majority | | 122 | 9.8 | N/A |
| Turnout | | 1,247 | 22.3 | –1.8 |
| Registered electors | | 5,623 | | |
| Liberal Democrats hold | | | | |
