= 2011 North Devon District Council election =

2011 UK local government election

Map of the results of the 2011 North Devon council election. Conservatives in blue, Liberal Democrats in yellow and independents in grey.

The 2011 North Devon District Council election took place on 5 May 2011 to elect members of North Devon District Council in Devon, England. The whole council was up for election and the Conservative Party lost overall control of the council to no overall control.

== Background ==
Before the election the council was controlled by the Conservatives with 22 councillors, compared to 17 Liberal Democrats and 4 independents. However North Devon was reported as one of the councils that the Conservatives were most likely to lose control of in 2011.

There were 120 candidates standing in the election for the 43 seats on the council. These were made up of 36 Conservatives, 33 Liberal Democrats, 20 independents, 17 Green Party, 10 Labour, 2 Trade Unionist and Socialist Coalition, 1 United Kingdom Independence Party and 1 Communist Party of Britain. The candidates included the former Liberal Democrat leader of the council, Malcolm Prowse, and Yvette Gubb, who both quit the Liberal Democrats to stand as independents in the election.

== Election result ==
The results saw the Conservative lose their majority on the council, dropping to 18 seats after suffering a net loss of four councillors. The Liberal Democrats stayed as the main opposition with 14 seats, but also dropped 3 seats. It was independents who made progress in the election, with the number of independent councillors going up to 11. Overall turnout in the election was 45.33%, ranging from a high of 63% in Bratton Fleming to a low of 30% in Forches and Whiddon Valley.

Among the councillors to lose their seats to independents were Conservatives Dick Jones and John Gill in Fremington and Liberal Democrats Carol Mccormack-Hole and Sue Sewell in Bickington and Roundswell, and South Molton respectively. Successful independent candidates included the former Conservative Rodney Cann and the former Liberal Democrat Malcolm Prowse.

10 of the 11 elected independent councillors divided up into 3 groups, New Wave, containing Rodney Cann, Joanne Bell, Frank Biederman and Brian Hockin, North Devon First, containing Malcolm Prowse, Julia Clark and Yvette Gubb, and Independent Group, containing Mike Edmunds, Eric Ley and Walter White. The final independent, John Moore, was not part of any group.

Following the election a coalition between the Liberal Democrat and independent councillors took control of the council from the former Conservative administration. Liberal Democrat Brian Greenslade became the new council leader, taking over from Conservative Des Brailey, while independent Rodney Cann became deputy leader. The new cabinet was made up of 5 Liberal Democrats and 4 independents.

North Devon local election result 2011
Party	Seats	Gains	Losses	Net gain/loss	Seats %	Votes %	Votes	+/−
Conservative	18	1	5	-4	41.9	36.1	18,269	-3.7
Liberal Democrats	14	2	5	-3	32.6	31.6	16,004	-11.2
Independent	11	7	0	+7	25.6	20.4	10,317	+12.9
Green	0	0	0	0	0.0	6.9	3,474	-2.4
Labour	0	0	0	0	0.0	3.9	1,985	+3.7
TUSC	0	0	0	0	0.0	0.7	340	+0.7
UKIP	0	0	0	0	0.0	0.3	131	+0.3
Communist	0	0	0	0	0.0	0.2	90	+0.0

2 independent candidates were unopposed.

== Ward results ==
Bickington & Roundswell (2)
Party	Candidate	Votes	%	±%
Independent	Rodney Cann*	850	55.6	−9.7
Independent	Brian Hockin	570	37.3	N/A
Liberal Democrats	Carol McCormack-Hole*	411	26.9	−17.6
Liberal Democrats	Jerry Hole	281	18.4	N/A
Conservative	Serena Thomas	278	18.2	−47.1
Conservative	Jason Ritterband-Fulcher	272	17.8	N/A
Labour	Jean Smalley	163	10.7	N/A
Turnout		1,550	43.39	+8.5
Independent hold		Swing		
Independent gain from Liberal Democrats		Swing		

Bishops Nympton
Party	Candidate	Votes	%	±%
Independent	Eric Ley*	unopposed	0.0	−84.2
Turnout		0	N/A	
Independent hold		Swing		

Bratton Fleming
Party	Candidate	Votes	%	±%
Independent	Malcolm Prowse*	544	54.1	−24.8
Conservative	Gordon Cumming	315	31.3	+10.2
Green	Ian Godfrey	147	14.6	N/A
Majority		229	22.8	
Turnout		1,018	62.78	+6.2
Independent gain from Liberal Democrats		Swing		

Braunton East (2)
Party	Candidate	Votes	%	±%
Conservative	Roy Lucas*	621	41.4	−8.6
Liberal Democrats	Derrick Spear	517	34.5	−4.8
Liberal Democrats	Elizabeth Spear	495	33.0	−2.9
Conservative	Sally Smith	489	32.6	−8.2
Green	Mary Breeds	276	18.4	+1.6
Green	Andy Leat	191	12.7	N/A
Labour	Valerie Cann	173	11.5	N/A
Turnout		1,528	47.03	+6.4
Conservative hold		Swing		
Liberal Democrats gain from Conservative		Swing		

Braunton West (2)
Party	Candidate	Votes	%	±%
Conservative	Caroline Chugg*	753	47.6	−9.5
Conservative	Jasmine Chesters*	677	42.8	−8.9
Liberal Democrats	Marguerite Shapland	478	30.2	−4.6
Liberal Democrats	Carol Woodford	342	21.6	−11.1
Green	Liz Wood	218	13.8	N/A
Labour	Steven Holden	206	13.0	+5.3
Green	Mary Clay	174	11.0	N/A
Turnout		1,618	47.60	+4.2
Conservative hold		Swing		
Conservative hold		Swing		

Central Town (Barnstaple) (2)
Party	Candidate	Votes	%	±%
Liberal Democrats	Faye Webber*	593	48.4	−4.9
Liberal Democrats	Adam Bradford	550	44.9	−2.4
Conservative	Simon Harvey	459	37.4	+1.3
Labour	Danny Neary	235	19.2	N/A
Conservative	Deborah Lewis	201	16.4	−5.2
Communist	Gerrard Sables	90	7.3	N/A
Turnout		1,256	33.86	+0.4
Liberal Democrats hold		Swing		
Liberal Democrats hold		Swing		

Chittlehampton
Party	Candidate	Votes	%	±%
Independent	Walter White	unopposed	0.0	N/A
Turnout		0	N/A	
Independent hold		Swing		

Chulmleigh
Party	Candidate	Votes	%	±%
Conservative	Sue Croft*	615	63.4	+14.9
Liberal Democrats	Trudy Weston	355	36.6	+1.3
Majority		260	26.8	
Turnout		991	54.55	
Conservative hold		Swing		

Combe Martin (2)
Party	Candidate	Votes	%	±%
Independent	Yvette Gubb	1,168	65.5	+9.8
Independent	Julia Clark	821	46.1	+0.6
Conservative	Sue Sussex*	764	42.9	−12.1
Conservative	Paul Crockett	541	30.4	−1.9
Turnout		1,821	54.18	+3.3
Independent gain from Liberal Democrats		Swing		
Independent gain from Conservative		Swing		

Forches & Whiddon Valley (Barnstaple) (2)
Party	Candidate	Votes	%	±%
Liberal Democrats	Sue Haywood*	534	58.6	−2.0
Liberal Democrats	Julie Hunt*	433	47.5	−3.8
Labour	Geoff Moody	208	22.8	N/A
Green	Neil Basil	200	22.0	±0.0
TUSC	Douglas Lowe	154	16.9	N/A
Turnout		966	29.50	+3.4
Liberal Democrats hold		Swing		
Liberal Democrats hold		Swing		

Fremington (2)
Party	Candidate	Votes	%	±%
Independent	Frank Biederman	1,266	66.8	N/A
Independent	Joanne Bell	969	51.1	N/A
Conservative	Dick Jones*	382	20.2	−19.0
Conservative	John Gill*	323	17.0	−20.4
Independent	Tony Wood	235	12.4	N/A
Liberal Democrats	Andrew Cann	184	9.7	−17.0
Liberal Democrats	Joy Cann	95	5.0	−21.4
Turnout		1,934	53.95	+11.1
Independent gain from Conservative		Swing		
Independent gain from Conservative		Swing		

Georgeham & Mortehoe (2)
Party	Candidate	Votes	%	±%
Liberal Democrats	Malcolm Wilkinson*	678	45.2	−2.9
Conservative	Pat Barker*	597	39.8	+2.7
Liberal Democrats	Lesley Slade	557	37.1	+0.3
Conservative	Edward Short	416	27.7	−5.6
Green	Mike Harrison	274	18.3	+2.1
Green	Rosemary Brian	205	13.7	+0.5
Turnout		1,526	50.00	+8.9
Liberal Democrats hold		Swing		
Conservative hold		Swing		

Heanton Punchardon
Party	Candidate	Votes	%	±%
Conservative	Andrea Davis*	301	52.7	−18.3
Liberal Democrats	Ray Shapland	139	24.3	−4.7
UKIP	Steve Crowther	131	22.9	N/A
Majority		162	28.4	−13.6
Turnout		577	35.19	+3.2
Conservative hold		Swing		

Ilfracombe Central (2)
Party	Candidate	Votes	%	±%
Conservative	Paul Crabb*	496	48.3	−10.4
Conservative	Paul Yabsley*	436	42.5	−6.2
Independent	Frank Pearson	381	37.1	+6.2
Independent	Netti Pearson	284	27.7	N/A
Green	Tim Cox	223	21.7	N/A
Turnout		1,052	29.64	−0.7
Conservative gain from Independent		Swing		
Conservative hold		Swing		

Ilfracombe East
Party	Candidate	Votes	%	±%
Independent	Mike Edmunds*	482	55.1	+6.8
Conservative	Robin Horne	312	35.7	−8.2
Labour	Tony Ebert	80	9.2	N/A
Majority		170	19.5	+15.1
Turnout		891	45.01	+2.6
Independent hold		Swing		

Ilfracombe West (2)
Party	Candidate	Votes	%	±%
Liberal Democrats	Geoff Fowler	678	50.0	+7.1
Conservative	Philip Webb	594	43.8	−4.2
Conservative	Colin Wright*	560	41.3	−19.2
Labour	Marianna Holdsworth	333	24.5	N/A
Turnout		1,378	37.93	+3.8
Liberal Democrats gain from Conservative		Swing		
Conservative hold		Swing		

Instow
Party	Candidate	Votes	%	±%
Conservative	Brian Moores*	423	59.9	+6.7
Independent	Stewart White	159	22.5	N/A
Independent	Michaela Willis	124	17.6	N/A
Majority		264	37.4	+31.0
Turnout		721	55.75	+11.5
Conservative hold		Swing		

Landkey, Swimbridge & Taw (2)
Party	Candidate	Votes	%	±%
Conservative	Glyn Lane	1,054	48.3	+23.9
Conservative	David Luggar*	973	44.6	+8.9
Liberal Democrats	Richard Medland	639	29.3	−6.9
Liberal Democrats	Mark Pegden	449	20.6	−14.1
Green	Mark Haworth-Booth	390	17.9	+5.1
Independent	Cliff Bell	341	15.6	−12.2
Turnout		2,209	54.13	+10.2
Conservative gain from Liberal Democrats		Swing		
Conservative hold		Swing		

Longbridge (Barnstaple) (2)
Party	Candidate	Votes	%	±%
Conservative	Des Brailey*	852	56.7	−3.2
Conservative	Jackie Flynn	601	40.0	−4.6
Liberal Democrats	Charlie Piper	529	35.2	+7.2
Liberal Democrats	Malcolm Rundle	504	33.5	+12.8
Labour	Mark Cann	225	15.0	N/A
Turnout		1,525	44.75	
Conservative hold		Swing		
Conservative hold		Swing		

Lynton & Lynmouth
Party	Candidate	Votes	%	±%
Liberal Democrats	Julian Gurney	401	47.7	+47.7
Independent	Tim Parker	220	26.2	N/A
Conservative	Ian Rigby	220	26.2	N/A
Majority		181	21.5	
Turnout		852	57.43	
Liberal Democrats hold		Swing		

Marwood
Party	Candidate	Votes	%	±%
Liberal Democrats	Joe Tucker*	447	48.2	+0.7
Conservative	Jim Pile	366	39.4	−3.2
Green	Micky Darling	115	12.4	+2.5
Majority		81	8.7	+3.8
Turnout		929	59.45	+1.5
Liberal Democrats hold		Swing		

Newport (Barnstaple) (2)
Party	Candidate	Votes	%	±%
Conservative	John Mathews*	624	41.9	+2.5
Conservative	Michael Harrison*	557	37.4	−2.8
Liberal Democrats	Chris Haywood**	498	33.5	+1.6
Liberal Democrats	Ian Roome	394	26.5	−3.8
Green	Ricky Knight	353	23.7	−5.3
Green	Rosie Haworth-Booth	200	13.4	−4.7
Labour	Marion Mason	143	9.6	N/A
Turnout		1,525	42.24	−1.4
Conservative hold		Swing		
Conservative hold		Swing		

Chris Haywood was a sitting councillor for Yeo Valley ward.

North Molton
Party	Candidate	Votes	%	±%
Conservative	Richard Edgell*	613	68.0	+68.0
Liberal Democrats	Michael Nelson	288	32.0	N/A
Majority		325	36.1	
Turnout		913	53.10	
Conservative hold		Swing		

Pilton (Barnstaple) (2)
Party	Candidate	Votes	%	±%
Liberal Democrats	Brian Greenslade*	872	56.9	−2.4
Liberal Democrats	Mair Manuel*	765	49.9	−6.2
Conservative	David Barker	349	22.8	+1.2
Conservative	Linda Wellstead	293	19.1	−0.5
Green	L'Anne Knight	284	18.5	−5.4
Labour	Hilary Greenfield	219	14.3	N/A
Turnout		1,553	43.72	+4.0
Liberal Democrats hold		Swing		
Liberal Democrats hold		Swing		

South Molton (2)
Party	Candidate	Votes	%	±%
Independent	John Moore	1,221	65.7	N/A
Liberal Democrats	David Worden*	733	39.4	−10.9
Independent	Tracey Lewis	682	36.7	N/A
Liberal Democrats	Sue Sewell*	618	33.2	−13.1
Turnout		1,879	47.69	+10.3
Independent gain from Liberal Democrats		Swing		
Liberal Democrats hold		Swing		

Witheridge
Party	Candidate	Votes	%	±%
Conservative	Jeremy Yabsley*	689	71.8	+13.1
Liberal Democrats	Kate Palmer	270	28.2	−13.1
Majority		419	43.7	+26.4
Turnout		983	51.57	+3.0
Conservative hold		Swing		

Yeo Valley (Barnstaple) (2)
Party	Candidate	Votes	%	±%
Liberal Democrats	Lesley Brown	677	59.6	−4.9
Liberal Democrats	Colin Payne*	600	52.9	+8.8
Conservative	Silvia Harrison	253	22.3	+2.2
Green	Sarah Willoughby	224	19.7	+0.5
TUSC	Paul Dyer	186	16.4	+6.7
Turnout		1,171	34.24	+5.3
Liberal Democrats hold		Swing		
Liberal Democrats hold		Swing		

== By-elections ==
Fremington (11 August 2011)
Party	Candidate	Votes	%	±%
Independent	Chris Turner	501	46.9	−4.2
Conservative	John Gill	308	28.8	+11.8
Independent	Tony Wood	196	18.3	−5.9
Green	Neil Basil	64	6.0	N/A
Turnout		1,073	29.99	−23.96
Independent hold		Swing		
