= Karl Ley =

British Army soldier and bomb disposal expert

- Born: Sheffield, England
- Military career
- Allegiance: United Kingdom
- Branch: British Army
- Rank: Major
- Unit: 11 Explosive Ordnance Disposal Regiment RLC
- Conflicts: Operation Banner; Iraq War; War in Afghanistan
- Awards: George Medal

Karl John Fairfax Ley, GM is a British Army soldier and a bomb disposal expert. As a staff sergeant in the 11 Explosive Ordnance Disposal Regiment RLC, he was awarded the George Medal for bomb disposal duties in Afghanistan, where he defused more roadside IEDs than anyone else during his six-month tour of duty.

== Personal life ==
Born in Sheffield Ley is married and has three children. As a child, Ley attended the Ecclesfield School.

== Career ==
Ley joined the British Army as an Ammunition Technician in the Royal Logistic Corps.

On 1 April 2017, having reached the rank of warrant officer class one, he was commissioned as a late entry officer with the rank of captain. He was promoted to major on 24 July 2021.

=== Afghanistan ===
Ley was sent on active service with the British Army in 2010 as part of the task force engaged on Operation Herrick. During this period, Ley was a staff sergeant engaged in Operation Moshtarak as part of the 15,000 troops involved in the operation. He was posted to the Counter-Improvised Explosive Device (C-IED) Task Force, responsible for providing IEDD operations to the task force. During the operation, Ley was interviewed and commented that, "We were on MOSHTARAK before MOSHTARAK started. We had to make sure that the routes were clear of devices so that the infantry guys could pass through safely." Ley recovered 139 devices during his tour in Helmand Province. This was "twice as many as any other bomb disposal expert." Ley was classified as a "high threat operator", once having to deactivate 42 bombs in a single village.

Upon his return from his tour of duty, Ley was awarded the George Medal on 24 September 2010 for "conspicuous gallantry whilst serving". The medal was presented by Prince Charles on 17 December 2010. He also, along with his unit, received service medals from Tim Stevenson, the Lord Lieutenant of Oxfordshire."
