= Chapeltown Academy =

Sixth form school in Sheffield, South Yorkshire, England

Location
- Hydra Business Park, Nether Lane; Chapeltown; Sheffield, South Yorkshire, S35 9ZX; England; 53.45036°N 1.45721°W

Information
- Type: Free school sixth form
- Established: 1 September 2014
- Local authority: Sheffield
- Department for Education URN: 140940 Tables
- Ofsted: Reports
- Gender: Mixed
- Age: 16 to 19
- Website: http://www.chapeltownacademy.com/

Chapeltown Academy is a free school sixth form located in the Chapeltown area of Sheffield, South Yorkshire, England. It is the first free school approved and opened in Sheffield.

Established in 2014, Chapeltown Academy offers A-level courses to students. It is located in a purpose-designed building at the Hydra Business Park. It was previously based at Thorncliffe Hall in the Thorncliffe Industrial Estate.
