= 2015 North Devon District Council election =

2015 UK local government election

Map of the results of the 2015 North Devon council election. Conservatives in blue, Liberal Democrats in yellow, independents in grey and UKIP in purple.

The 2015 North Devon District Council election took place on 7 May 2015 to elect members of North Devon District Council in England. This was on the same day as other local elections. The whole council was up for election and remained in no overall control.

== Background ==
Before the election the council had no majority party, with the Conservatives having 18 councillors, 14 Liberal Democrats and 11 Independents.

There were 149 candidates standing in the election for the 43 seats on the council (up from 120 in 2011). These were made up of 41 Conservatives, 37 Green Party, 28 Liberal Democrats, 20 Independents, 9 Labour, 8 United Kingdom Independence Party (UKIP), 4 Trade Unionist and Socialist Coalition and 2 Communist Party of Britain. The candidates included the former Liberal Democrat leader of the council, Malcolm Prowse, and Yvette Gubb, who both quit the Liberal Democrats to stand as independents in the election, and Jeremy Yabsley who quit the Conservatives to also run as an independent. Unlike in previous years, no ward contest went unopposed.

== Election result ==
North Devon local election result 2015
Party	Seats	Gains	Losses	Net gain/loss	Seats %	Votes %	Votes	+/−
Conservative	19	4	3	+1	44.2	35.6	28,552	-0.5
Liberal Democrats	12	0	2	-2	27.9	24.7	19,793	-6.9
Independent	11	3	3	0	25.6	16.0	12,808	-4.4
UKIP	1	1	0	+1	2.32	4.4	3,560	+4.1
Green	0	0	0	0	0.0	16.0	12,847	+9.1
Labour	0	0	0	0	0.0	2.7	2,143	-0.2
TUSC	0	0	0	0	0.0	0.5	373	-0.2
Communist	0	0	0	0	0.0	0.2	163	0.0

== Ward results ==
Bickington & Roundswell (2)
Party	Candidate	Votes	%	±%
Conservative	Rodney Sheridan Cann*	1,024	40.5	−15.1
Conservative	Jackie Flynn	653	25.8	+7.6
Liberal Democrats	David Chalmers	643	25.4	+7.0
Liberal Democrats	Carol McCormack-Hole	558	22.0	−4.9
UKIP	Brian David Hockin*	556	22.0	−15.3
Independent	Graham Turner	426	16.8	N/A
Green	Christine Basil	226	8.9	N/A
Labour	Mary Elizabeth Brodie	183	7.2	−3.5
Green	Linda Jane Mack	135	5.3	N/A
Turnout		2,549	70.58	+27.18
Conservative gain from Independent		Swing		
Conservative gain from Independent		Swing		

Bishops Nympton (1)
Party	Candidate	Votes	%	±%
Independent	Eric Ley*	1,052	79.7	+79.7
Green	Sarah Warren	268	20.3	N/A
Majority		784	59.39	
Turnout		1,320	78.08	
Independent hold		Swing		

Bratton Fleming (1)
Party	Candidate	Votes	%	±%
Independent	Malcolm Prowse*	594	45.8	−8.3
Conservative	Peter Harper Freeman	456	35.1	+3.8
Green	Ian Godfrey	164	12.6	−2.0
Labour	Marion Mason	84	6.5	N/A
Majority		138	10.6	−12.2
Turnout		1,298	76.76	+13.96
Independent hold		Swing		

Braunton East (2)
Party	Candidate	Votes	%	±%
Conservative	Robin James Bonds	802	34.6	+2.0
Conservative	Roy Lucas*	769	33.1	−8.3
Liberal Democrats	Derrick Spear*	766	33.0	−1.5
Liberal Democrats	Elizabeth Spear	764	32.9	−0.1
Green	Katy Beardshall	467	20.1	+1.5
Green	Gwen de Groot	348	15.0	+2.3
Labour	Danny James Neary	158	6.8	−4.7
TUSC	Gregory Molyneux	54	2.3	N/A
Turnout		2,380	74.15	+27.15
Conservative hold		Swing		
Conservative gain from Liberal Democrats		Swing		

Braunton West (2)
Party	Candidate	Votes	%	±%
Conservative	Caroline Chugg*	1,185	47.7	+0.1
Conservative	Jasmine Chesters*	1,137	45.8	+3.0
Liberal Democrats	Dave Bennett	835	33.6	+3.4
Liberal Democrats	Wayne Withey	600	24.2	+2.6
Labour	Valerie Cann	482	19.4	+6.4
Turnout		2,515	73.12	+25.52
Conservative hold		Swing		
Conservative hold		Swing		

Central Town (Barnstaple) (2)
Party	Candidate	Votes	%	±%
Liberal Democrats	Faye Webber*	892	43.1	−5.3
Liberal Democrats	Adam Bradford*	799	38.6	−6.3
Conservative	Martin Kennaugh	515	24.9	−12.5
Green	Julia Daunt	478	23.1	N/A
Green	Michelle Watkin	463	22.4	N/A
Conservative	Nigel Wright	458	22.1	+5.7
Communist	Gerrard Sables	105	5.1	−2.2
Turnout		2,110	33.90	+23.16
Liberal Democrats hold		Swing		
Liberal Democrats hold		Swing		

Chittlehampton (1)
Party	Candidate	Votes	%	±%
Independent	Walter White*	735	45.3	+45.3
Conservative	George Moseley	538	33.1	N/A
UKIP	Chris Turner	178	11.0	N/A
Green	Sarah Willoughby	173	10.7	N/A
Majority		197	12.13	
Turnout		1,624	80.23	
Independent hold		Swing		

Chulmleigh (1)
Party	Candidate	Votes	%	±%
Conservative	Sue Croft*	723	51.3	−12.1
Liberal Democrats	Peter Gravell	279	19.8	−16.8
UKIP	Chris Turner	227	16.1	N/A
Green	Giles Rigler	180	12.8	N/A
Majority		444	31.50	+4.70
Turnout		1,409	75.21	+20.61
Conservative hold		Swing		

Combe Martin (2)
Party	Candidate	Votes	%	±%
Independent	Yvette Gubb*	1,281	54.5	−11.0
Conservative	John Lovering	1,075	45.7	+2.8
Independent	Julia Clark*	814	34.6	−11.5
Conservative	David Barker	519	22.1	−8.3
Green	Kyle Chivers	468	19.9	N/A
Turnout		2,367	72.53	+18.33
Independent hold		Swing		
Conservative gain from Independent		Swing		

Forches & Whiddon Valley (Barnstaple) (2)
Party	Candidate	Votes	%	±%
Liberal Democrats	Sue Haywood*	825	46.8	−11.8
Liberal Democrats	Julie Hunt*	665	37.8	−9.7
Conservative	David Hoare	561	31.9	N/A
Conservative	Symmo Simpson	354	20.1	N/A
Green	Neil Basil	299	17.0	−5.0
Green	L'Anne Knight	235	13.3	N/A
TUSC	Douglas Lowe	130	7.4	−9.5
Turnout		1,815	57.72	+28.22
Liberal Democrats hold		Swing		
Liberal Democrats hold		Swing		

Fremington (2)
Party	Candidate	Votes	%	±%
Independent	Frank Biederman*	1,573	59.4	−7.4
Independent	Tony Wood	793	29.9	+17.5
UKIP	Jim Bell	688	26.0	N/A
Conservative	Sue Kingdom	583	22.0	+1.8
Conservative	Jason Ritterband-Fulcher	421	15.9	−1.1
Green	Jane Basil	307	11.6	N/A
Turnout		2,669	73.74	+19.74
Independent hold		Swing		
Independent gain from Independent		Swing		

Georgeham & Mortehoe (2)
Party	Candidate	Votes	%	±%
Conservative	Pat Barker*	901	42.1	+2.3
Liberal Democrats	Malcolm Wilkinson*	841	39.3	−5.9
Conservative	Bob Darell	671	31.4	+3.7
Liberal Democrats	Steve Woodman	646	30.2	−6.9
Green	Mike Harrison	501	23.4	+5.1
Green	Johnie Walker	434	20.3	+6.6
Turnout		2,176	74.77	+24.77
Liberal Democrats hold		Swing		
Conservative hold		Swing		

Heanton Punchardon (1)
Party	Candidate	Votes	%	±%
Conservative	Andrea Davis*	666	67.9	+15.2
Green	Brad Bunyard	315	32.1	N/A
Majority		351	35.8	+7.4
Turnout		981	59.90	+24.7
Conservative hold		Swing		

Ilfracombe Central (2)
Party	Candidate	Votes	%	±%
Conservative	Paul Crabb*	713	38.9	−9.4
Independent	Jim Campbell	520	28.4	N/A
Conservative	Paul Yabsley*	494	27.0	−15.5
Green	Noel Grummitt	410	22.4	+0.7
UKIP	Stuart Robertson	396	21.6	N/A
Green	Frank Pearson	388	21.2	−15.9
Labour	Toby Ebert	327	17.8	N/A
Turnout		1,855	53.97	+24.37
Conservative hold		Swing		
Independent gain from Conservative		Swing		

Ilfracombe East (1)
Party	Candidate	Votes	%	±%
Independent	Mike Edmunds*	817	59.5	+4.4
Conservative	Lynda Courtnadge	410	29.9	−5.8
Independent	Eric Hayes	145	10.6	N/A
Majority		407	29.66	+10.16
Turnout		1,372	69.64	+24.64
Independent hold		Swing		

Ilfracombe West (2)
Party	Candidate	Votes	%	±%
Liberal Democrats	Geoff Fowler*	936	41.5	−8.5
UKIP	Ian Meadlarkin	579	25.6	N/A
Conservative	Felix James Milton	565	25.0	−18.8
Conservative	Edward Short	420	18.6	−22.7
Liberal Democrats	Kit Leck	417	18.5	N/A
Green	Netti Pearson	410	18.2	N/A
Labour	Marianna Holdsworth	253	11.2	−13.3
Green	Oliver John Tooley	253	11.2	N/A
TUSC	Katherine Darkin	101	4.5	N/A
Turnout		2,281	63.94	+26.04
UKIP gain from Conservative		Swing		
Liberal Democrats hold		Swing		

Instow (1)
Party	Candidate	Votes	%	±%
Conservative	Brian Moores*	676	67.4	+7.5
Green	Stewart White	326	32.5	+10.0
Majority		350	34.9	−2.5
Turnout		1,002	78.25	+22.45
Conservative hold		Swing		

Landkey, Swimbridge & Taw (2)
Party	Candidate	Votes	%	±%
Conservative	Glyn Lane*	1,376	45.8	−2.5
Conservative	David Luggar*	1,156	38.5	−6.1
Liberal Democrats	Tolley Jacob Angell	740	24.6	−4.7
Liberal Democrats	Tasha Haywood	636	21.2	+0.6
Green	Josie Knight	515	17.1	N/A
UKIP	Chris Verney	484	16.1	N/A
Green	Mark Haworth-Booth	441	14.7	−3.2
Turnout		3,010	74.91	+20.81
Conservative hold		Swing		
Conservative hold		Swing		

Longbridge (Barnstaple) (2)
Party	Candidate	Votes	%	±%
Conservative	Des Brailey*	1,439	59.9	+3.2
Conservative	Dick Jones	942	39.2	−0.8
Liberal Democrats	Alan Rennles	715	29.8	−5.4
Liberal Democrats	Loki Dawson	576	24.0	−9.5
Green	Shona Davis	288	12.0	N/A
Green	Gary Hemmings	248	10.3	N/A
Labour	Oliver Bell	231	9.6	−5.4
Turnout		2,438	71.78	+26.98
Conservative hold		Swing		
Conservative hold		Swing		

Lynton & Lynmouth (1)
Party	Candidate	Votes	%	±%
Independent	John Patrinos	399	39.0	N/A
Conservative	Tony Meakin	380	37.1	+10.9
Independent	John Dallyn	245	23.9	N/A
Majority		19	1.9	
Turnout		1,024	73.31	+15.91
Independent gain from Liberal Democrats		Swing		

Marwood (1)
Party	Candidate	Votes	%	±%
Liberal Democrats	Joe Tucker*	582	46.2	−2.0
Conservative	Jim Pile	504	40.0	+0.6
Green	Micky Darling	173	13.7	+1.3
Majority		78	6.2	−2.5
Turnout		1,259	78.9	+19.4
Liberal Democrats hold		Swing		

Newport (Barnstaple) (2)
Party	Candidate	Votes	%	±%
Conservative	John Mathews*	1,025	41.6	−0.3
Conservative	Michael Harrison*	889	36.1	−1.3
Liberal Democrats	Chris Haywood	812	32.9	−0.6
Green	Matt Chamings	728	29.5	+5.8
Liberal Democrats	Julian Williams	510	20.7	−5.8
Green	Rosie Haworth-Booth	477	19.3	+5.9
Turnout		2,496	68.06	+26.06
Conservative hold		Swing		
Conservative hold		Swing		

North Molton (1)
Party	Candidate	Votes	%	±%
Conservative	Richard Edgell*	968	71.9	+3.9
Green	Debbie Drennen	379	25.9	N/A
Majority		643	47.70	+11.64
Turnout		1,347	76.52	+23.42
Conservative hold		Swing		

Pilton (Barnstaple) (2)
Party	Candidate	Votes	%	±%
Liberal Democrats	Brian Greenslade*	1,133	48.0	−8.9
Liberal Democrats	Mair Manuel*	841	35.7	−14.2
Green	Ricky Knight	666	28.2	+9.7
Conservative	Rachel Martin	532	22.6	−0.2
Conservative	Sue D'Souza	498	21.1	+2.0
Green	Ian Long	355	15.1	N/A
Labour	Hilary Greenfield	245	10.4	−3.9
Communist	Stuart John McGuiness	58	2.5	N/A
Turnout		2,373	67.68	+23.98
Liberal Democrats hold		Swing		
Liberal Democrats hold		Swing		

South Molton (2)
Party	Candidate	Votes	%	±%
Independent	John Moore*	996	38.1	−27.6
Liberal Democrats	David Worden*	651	24.9	−14.5
Liberal Democrats	Matthew Bushell	585	22.4	−10.8
Conservative	Michael Buckingham	547	20.9	N/A
Independent	Tracey Lewis	486	18.6	−18.1
Conservative	Mike Smith	432	16.5	N/A
Green	Emily Anne Abbott	318	12.2	N/A
Independent	Stephen Lock	295	11.3	N/A
Independent	Marc Cornelius	289	11.0	N/A
Green	John Robert Elvidge	199	7.6	N/A
Independent	Ron Herniman	98	3.7	N/A
Turnout		2,669	66.22	+18.52
Independent hold		Swing		
Liberal Democrats hold		Swing		

Witheridge (1)
Party	Candidate	Votes	%	±%
Independent	Jeremy Yabsley*	1,044	74.5	+2.7
Green	Woody Fox	358	25.5	N/A
Majority		686	48.9	+5.2
Turnout		1,402	75.79	+24.19
Independent gain from Conservative		Swing		

Yeo Valley (Barnstaple) (2)
Party	Candidate	Votes	%	±%
Liberal Democrats	Ian Roome	838	41.6	−18.0
Liberal Democrats	Joy Cann	708	35.1	−17.8
UKIP	Andy Norden	452	22.4	N/A
Conservative	Garth Goodwin	298	14.8	−7.5
Conservative	Linda Wellstead	277	13.7	N/A
Green	Tarla Cox	235	11.7	−8.0
Green	Louise Goodger	219	10.9	N/A
Independent	Graham Payne	206	10.2	N/A
Labour	Roy Ernest Tomlinson	180	8.9	N/A
TUSC	Peter Jordan	88	4.4	−12.0
Turnout		2,055	60.79	+26.59
Liberal Democrats hold		Swing		
Liberal Democrats hold		Swing		

== By-elections ==
Braunton East (2 November 2017)
Party	Candidate	Votes	%	±%
Liberal Democrats	Derrick Spear	459	37.1	+4.1
Green	Brad Bunyard	387	31.3	+11.2
Conservative	Felix Milton	225	18.2	−14.9
Labour	Mark Cann	165	13.3	+6.5
Turnout		1,241	43	
Liberal Democrats gain from Conservative		Swing		

Newport (Barnstaple) (7 December 2017)
Party	Candidate	Votes	%	±%
Liberal Democrats	Caroline Leaver	390	38.8	+5.9
Conservative	Martin Kennaugh	373	37.1	+1.0
Green	Ricky Knight	159	15.8	−13.7
Labour	Siobhan Strode	83	8.3	N/A
Turnout		1,006	36.3	
Liberal Democrats gain from Conservative		Swing		

Fremington (28 June 2018)
Party	Candidate	Votes	%	±%
Independent	Jayne Mackie	577	50.8	N/A
Conservative	Jim Pilkington	356	31.3	+9.3
Liberal Democrats	Graham Lofthouse	119	10.5	N/A
Labour	Blake Ladley	65	5.7	N/A
Green	Lou Goodger	19	1.7	−9.9
Turnout		1,138	29.10	
Independent gain from Independent		Swing		
