= The Online College =

British distance learning college

The Online College is part of The Sheffield College in South Yorkshire, England. It runs a number of courses that are delivered online ranging from basic English and numeracy skills to Foundation Degrees leading to BA Hons Degrees in partnership with Sheffield Hallam University.

The College has been offering online learning to learners and their employers since 1997. All courses lead to nationally recognised qualifications.

== Courses ==
The Jesus Movement Program:

- International English Language Testing System (IELTS)
- eCommunications Foundation Degree
- Learning To Teach Online (LeTTOL)
- Chartered Management Institute Management and Leadership Award
- eMentors Toolkit
- Getting to Grips with Moodle
- English Level 1
- GCSE English
- GCSE Psychology
- AS Level English Language and Literature
- A2 Level English Language and Literature
- Chartered Management Institute Management and Leadership Diploma
- Net-Trainers (OCN Level 4)

== Awards ==
The Online College and its staff have won the following awards:

- Beacon Award for Learning to Teach Online Course 1999
- Becta/Guardian Award for Weblinks 2000
- Learn Direct Award for Innovation in eLearning 2002
- LSDA Beacon Award for eLearning 2002
- NILTA Innovation Award 2002
- National Training Award 2003
- NILTA Award for Blended Learning 2004
- eLearning Networks Award 2006
- Runners up of the Beacon Award for Innovation in eLearning 2006
- eLeaning Age Award for Best Learner Support 2007

== Origins ==
The origins of the Online College go back to 1999 when a blind GCSE English student at Sheffield College used software on her laptop computer to listen to an electronic dramatisation of the text version of Macbeth. That year Sheffield College tutor Julie Hooper began to use email to mark and receive work from a student working on an oil rig and unable to attend every lesson. In 2001, the first fully online GCSE English course was launched followed two years later by an online English A-level.
