= UTC Sheffield Olympic Legacy Park =

Location
- 2 Old Hall Road; Sheffield, South Yorkshire, S9 3TU; England; 53.3970°N 1.4261°W

Information
- Type: University technical college
- Established: 2016
- Local authority: Sheffield City Council
- Department for Education URN: 142605 Tables
- Ofsted: Reports
- Principal: Jessica Stevenson
- Gender: Coeducational
- Age: 14 to 19
- Public transport: Y TT; Arena / Olympic Legacy Park
- Website: www.utcsheffield.org.uk

UTC Sheffield Olympic Legacy Park is a University Technical College which opened in September 2016 on the Olympic Legacy Park site in north-east Sheffield, South Yorkshire, England.

The UTC is sponsored by The Sheffield College and Sheffield Hallam University, who also sponsor UTC Sheffield City Centre, another UTC in the same city, which opened in 2013.

== Description ==
UTC Sheffield Olympic Legacy Park opened in September 2016 and is funded directly by the Department for Education. It is governed by Sheffield UTC Academy Trust, and co-sponsored by Sheffield Chamber of Commerce and Industry, Sheffield Hallam University and The Sheffield College.

The UTC offers technical qualifications in computing, health sciences and sports science, as well as GCSEs and A Levels. Students study their technical subject for a substantial proportion of the week. The college day is longer than in most secondary schools. Students come from the Sheffield City region and beyond at the start of year 9, as this is a 14-19 year school.

With a maximum capacity of 600 it is smaller than the average school and has a smaller proportion of disadvantaged pupils supported by pupil premium funding and a smaller proportion of pupils with special educational needs (SEND).

== Outcomes ==
Careers information, advice and guidance are an integral part of pupils’ learning experience. By design students at the UTC have access to industry experts, employer mentor days and work experience. This raised the students aspirations to engage with the world of computing, sports science and health sciences. In 2017–18, the progression of students in the sixth form to higher education, further education or employment was high, and 75% of the destinations were related to the UTC's specialisms.
