= Oasis Academy Don Valley =

Location
- Leeds Road; Attercliffe; Sheffield, South Yorkshire, S9 3TY; England; 53.3956°N 1.4272°W

Information
- Type: Academy
- Established: 1 September 2015
- Local authority: Sheffield
- Trust: Oasis Trust
- Department for Education URN: 140394 Tables
- Ofsted: Reports
- Principal: James Pape
- Gender: Mixed
- Age: 2 to 16
- Enrolment: 622 as of February 2021
- Capacity: 1170
- Public transport: Y TT Attercliffe
- Website: www.oasisacademydonvalley.org

Oasis Academy Don Valley is an all-through school located in the Attercliffe area of Sheffield, South Yorkshire, England. The school opened in September 2015, and is sponsored by the Oasis Trust. It opened with just 4 year groups and these are working their way through the school, in September 2020 the oldest students had entered the first year nine. The school is somewhat unusual in teaching German as the first foreign language.

== Description ==
The school opened in 2015 with 54 students in 4 year groups with 18 teachers on the site of the former Don Valley Stadium in the Olympic Legacy Park. By 2018 there were 464 pupils on its roll, around 60 staff, and the first students had entered Key Stage 3. At its first Ofsted, this was rated as a 'Good' school.

The school has grown over the last three years, and a high proportion of pupils in the school have started at different times in the primary school cycle. The school includes provision for two-year olds and the first Year 6 cohort in 2017/18. The large majority of pupils come from Asian backgrounds, while the remainder are from a wide range of minority ethnic backgrounds. A few pupils are White British. A much higher-than-average proportion of pupils speak English as an additional language. The proportion of pupils known to be eligible for the pupil premium is above average.

== Curriculum ==
The academy enrolls two-year olds into its Early Years provision, and then 4 year olds into reception. These youngsters are behind on basic skill, and they are taught in skills groups rather than strict age groups- with the aim of them having caught up by entry to year one. From year one emphasis is placed phonics, writing and Maths Mastery. As is customary in Key Stage one and two education, the strands of the National Curriculum are taught in termly topics. Ofsted commented "Good-quality teaching ensures that pupils overall make strong progress from the time they enter the school". ERIC is the acronym used for the whole class reading sessions -Everyone Reading in Class. The academy publishes a termly Knowledge organiser for each year group.

== Chengdu partnership ==
The City of Sheffield has a partnership agreement with Chengdu, China. The city is planning to build an English-language kindergarten and primary school based on Oasis Academy Don Valley. Design firm Bond Bryan is the contractor for both Oasis and the new school.
