= Ecclesfield School =

Location
- Chapeltown Road; Sheffield, South Yorkshire, S35 9WD; England; 53.45343°N 1.46607°W

Information
- Type: Academy
- Motto: Together we achieve.
- Established: 1931
- Department for Education URN: 145191 Tables
- Ofsted: Reports
- Head teacher: Richard Walkden
- Age: 11 to 16
- Enrolment: 1681
- Capacity: 1750
- Houses: Turing, Nightingale, Franklin, Rowling, Churchill
- Colours: Red , Amber
- Website: Ecclesfield School

Ecclesfield School is a coeducational secondary school with academy status situated on Chapeltown Road (A6135) between Chapeltown and Ecclesfield, South Yorkshire in the East Ecclesfield district of Sheffield, England. It is for ages 11–16. It has about 1,750 pupils, making it the largest school in Sheffield.

== History ==
Ecclesfield School opened as "Ecclesfield Grammar School" in 1931. Its foundation was largely due to the efforts of Lady Mabel Smith, a Labour councillor on the West Riding County Council, and daughter of Earl Fitzwilliam. Lady Mabel was Chairman of the School Governors from 1931 to her death in 1951.

The school was designed in 1939 by Frederick MacManus, an Irish born architect working for (Sir) John Burney, Tait & Lorne architects of London.

In 1931 Ecclesfield Grammar School provided for three streams of 30 pupils, increased to five in 1952 with an annual intake of 150 and a total number on roll of 800; by this time 2,500 pupils had been admitted. Following integration with Hunshelf pupil intake increased further. Total pupil numbers during the 36 years the school operated as a grammar school was approximately 4,450, and approximately 10,000 since it became a comprehensive.

Major extensions to the school were made in 1952-53, including Lady Mabel Hall, kitchens and classrooms, and separate science and craft blocks. Further building undertaken during the 1960s included a sports hall with changing rooms and a multi-story classroom block, with the gymnasium from the previous building converted into a library. Concurrently, a separate Hunshelf School was built on part of the playing fields.

During the 1950s new entrants were allocated to forms according to surname alphabetical order, and were allotted to a "house", Strafford, Brontë, Fairfax or Priestley, for weekly assembly and competitive sports.

In 1967 the School became Ecclesfield Comprehensive School after amalgamating with Hunshelf Secondary Modern School, and served the areas of Ecclesfield, Chapeltown, Hoyland, Elsecar, High Green, Bradfield, Stannington, Grenoside, Oughtibridge and Wharncliffe Side, on the southern boundary of the West Riding of Yorkshire between Sheffield and Barnsley. Initially, it remained separate from Hunshelf School, but the two schools later amalgamated to form an enlarged Ecclesfield Comprehensive, run by Sheffield City Council.

Again, major building work took place in the school in the early 21st century, as the Priory, Wharncliffe and Cowley blocks were built (often shortened to just P, W, and C) as well as the new canteen and car park. It was here where the school gained its 'Specialist in visual and performing arts' status. On 1 April 2014, the school converted to academy status.

== Drama ==
The school has drama and music studios, and a theatre with tiered seating and lighting system. Productions include musicals and serious dramas. Ecclesfield School teachers Paul O'Farrell and Ben Smithard wrote and directed the play Exit Stage Left which was performed at the Edinburgh Fringe Festival in July & August 2012, and was well-reviewed in the local Sheffield Star. The play won the Yorkshire music and drama award. They have also directed musicals and plays which take place in the school's Lady Mabel Hall annually.

== Academic performance ==
At GCSE, the school performs below average for Sheffield LEA. In a report from 2017 the school achieved "Inadequate" in its Ofsted Report.

== Notable former pupils ==
- Jamie Cook, guitarist with the Arctic Monkeys
- Karl Ley, bomb disposal expert, awarded the George Medal
- James Lomas, actor
- Steve Peat, mountain biker
- Billy Sharp, professional footballer
- Simon Stainrod

=== Ecclesfield Grammar School ===
- Chris Baines, environmentalist, writer and broadcaster 1958-65
- Joanna Constantinidis, potter
- Elizabeth Gale, soprano opera singer, from Hoyland
- Barry Hines, author
- David Merry CMG, High Commissioner to Botswana from 2001–05
- Frank Newby, structural engineer, designed the Skylon for the Festival of Britain and the aviary for London Zoo
- Donald Pleasence, actor
- Sheila Sherwood, long-jumper, won the silver in the 1968 Mexico Olympic Games

== Former teachers ==
- Christopher Price, Labour MP from 1966-70 for Birmingham Perry Barr, and brother of Helen Jackson (Labour MP for Sheffield Hillsborough from 1992-2005)

== See also ==
- Education in Sheffield
