= Mark Haworth-Booth =

British academic and historian of photography

Mark Haworth-Booth OBE (born 20 August 1944) is a British academic and historian of photography. He was a curator at the Victoria & Albert Museum in London from 1970 to 2004.

== Family ==
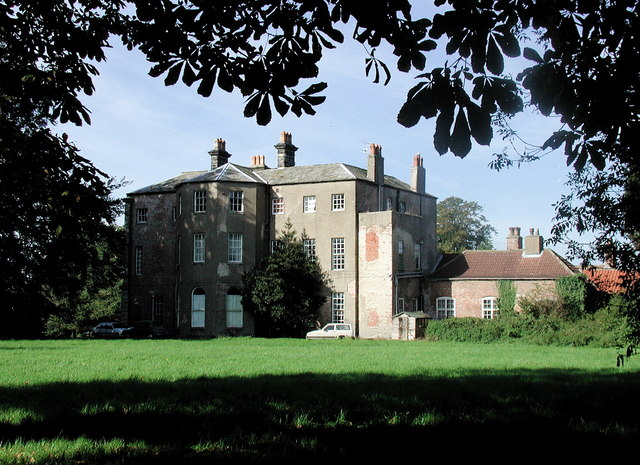
Hull Bank House, East Riding Yorks

His family on his father’s side were minor gentry seated at Hull Bank House, Kingston upon Hull Yorkshire, now Haworth Hall. One of his forebears married the sister of the poet and MP for Hull, Andrew Marvell.

== Early life and education ==
Haworth-Booth was the youngest son of Alderman Antony Haworth-Booth, chairman of East Sussex County Council, and Eva Holm, only daughter of the Danish stage and film actress Astrid Holm and her husband Holger Holm, ballet dancer and film actor.

He was educated at Brighton College before going up to Clare College, Cambridge to read English literature, before undertaking postgraduate studies in Art history at the University of Edinburgh and (much later) creative writing at Exeter (MA with Distinction).

== Work ==
Haworth-Booth started his career at the Manchester Art Gallery in 1969 and worked at the Victoria and Albert Museum from 1970 to 2004, becoming Senior Curator of Photographs and played a major role in building up its collection of photography. He has curated many exhibitions, including Photography: An Independent Art (1997), and Things: A Spectrum of Photography, 1850–2001 (2004). The last photography exhibition he curated, with the Galerie nationale du Jeu de Paume in Paris and the National Portrait Gallery, London, was a centenary retrospective of the pioneering photographer Camille Silvy (1834–1910). It was titled Camille Silvy. Photographer of Modern Life 1834–1910 and exhibited at the National Portrait Gallery in 2010. He researched the Silvy Exhibition catalogue at the J. Paul Getty Museum, Los Angeles, as a Museum Scholar in 2008.

Inaugural Visiting Professor of Photography at the University of the Arts London (2002–2009), he acted as a consultant on the BBC television series The Genius of Photography, aired in 2007 and again in 2009.

Since retiring from most photographic activity he has focused on environmental campaigning and writing. He has published poems in national magazines since 1986, won awards and published two books of poems: Wild Track (2005) and Wild is the Wind (with Tessa Traeger’s photographs, 2017). Since May 2023 he has been a Green Party councillor on North Devon District council.

== Personal life ==
Haworth-Booth lives in North Devon with his wife Rosie (née Miles), whom he married in 1979. Rosemary Miles (her professional name) made many important acquisitions of BAME printmakers for the V&A collection and served as the chair of Autograph, the Association of Black Photographers. They have two daughters.

== Honours ==
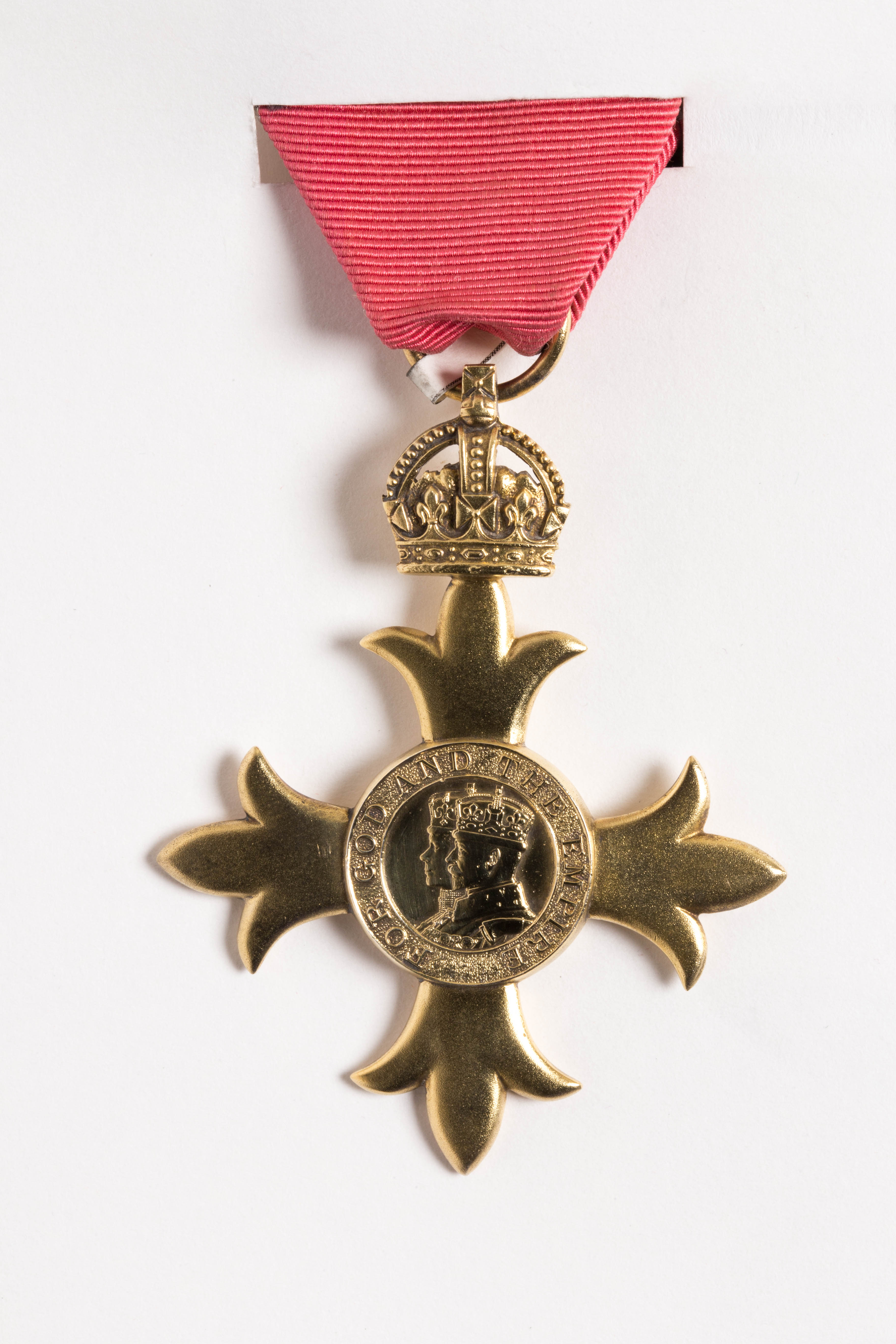
OBE insignia

- 2005: OBE, for "services to museums".

=== Academic awards ===
- 1987: Hood Medal, Royal Photographic Society
- 1996: Hon FRPS, Royal Photographic Society
- 2005: Honorary Research Fellow, Victoria & Albert Museum (V&A)
- 2006: Fenton Award, Royal Photographic Society
- 2006: Senior Fellow of the Royal College of Art
- 2012: Honorary Doctor of Arts, University of the Arts (Hon DA)
- 2024: Eastlake Medal and Honorary Fellowship, Royal Photographic Society

== Publications ==
- Mark Haworth-Booth (1992), Camille Silvy: River Scene, France, Getty Publications, ISBN 978-0-89236-205-9
- Haworth-Booth, Mark (1994), Metamorphoses : photography in the electronic age (1st ed.), Aperture Foundation, ISBN 978-0-89381-602-5
- Arnatt, Keith; Haworth-Booth, Mark; Aperture Foundation (1988), British photography : towards a bigger picture, Aperture, ISBN 978-0-89381-340-6
- Bernard, Bruce; Haworth-Booth, Mark (25 October 2002), One hundred photographs : a collection by Bruce Bernard, Phaidon Press (published 2002), ISBN 978-0-7148-4278-3
- Haworth-Booth, Mark; McCullin, Don (1983), Donald McCullin, Collins, ISBN 978-0-00-411935-9
- Strand, Paul; Haworth-Booth, Mark (1997). Paul Strand. Aperture (published 1987). ISBN 978-0-89381-746-6.
- Victoria and Albert Museum. Department of Prints and Drawings; Strong, Roy; Haworth-Booth, Mark (1981). Old and modern masters of photography. H.M.S.O. ISBN 978-0-11-290362-8.
- Victoria & Albert Museum; Haworth-Booth, Mark (1997). Photography, an independent art : photographs from the Victoria and Albert Museum 1839-1996. V & A Publications. ISBN 978-1-85177-204-9.
- Yoneda, Tomoko; Haworth-Booth, Mark; Iizawa, Kōtarō (2004). Between visible. Nazraeli Press in association with JGS. ISBN 978-1-59005-045-3.
- Haworth-Booth, Mark (2006). The Folio Society book of the 100 greatest photographs. Folio Society.
- Haworth-Booth, Mark; Miller, Lee (January 2007). The art of Lee Miller (Hardback ed.). V&A (published 2007). ISBN 978-0-300-12375-3.
- Baltz, Lewis; Haworth-Booth, Mark (1986). San Quentin Point (1st ed.). Aperture. ISBN 978-0-89381-247-8.
- Haworth-Booth, Mark (2004). Things : a spectrum of photography 1850-2001. Jonathan Cape in association with the Victoria & Albert Museum. ISBN 978-0-224-07289-2.
- Mellor, David; Brandt, Bill; Haworth-Booth, Mark (1985). Bill Brandt, behind the camera : photographs, 1928-1983. Aperture. ISBN 978-0-89381-191-4.
- Coe, Brian; Haworth-Booth, Mark (1983). A guide to early photographic processes. Victoria & Albert Museum. ISBN 978-0-903696-23-4.
- Brandt, Bill (1977). Shadow of light : photographs ([New] / introductions by Cyril Connolly and Mark Haworth-Booth ed.). Gordon Fraser Gallery. ISBN 978-0-900406-65-2.
- Brandt, Bill; Haworth-Booth, Mark; Bill Brandt Archive (2004). Brandt nudes : a new perspective (Edition limited to 1000 copies of which numbers 1-100 include a platinum print ed.). Bill Brandt Archive. ISBN 978-0-9547048-0-3.
- Victoria & Albert Museum (1984). Haworth-Booth, Mark (ed.). The Golden age of British photography, 1839-1900 : photographs from the Victoria and Albert Museum, London, with selections from the Philadelphia Museum of Art, Royal Archives, Windsor Castle, the Royal Photographic Society, Bath, Science Museum, London, Scottish National Portrait Gallery, Edinburgh. Aperture in association with the Victoria and Albert Museum and the Philadelphia Museum of Art; New York : Distributed in the U.S. by Viking Penguin. ISBN 978-0-89381-145-7.
- Haworth-Booth, Mark, (curator.) (1988), Hitchcock, Barbara (ed.), Selections 4 : the International Polaroid Collection, Polaroid Corporation, ISBN 978-0-9616459-2-2
- Arnatt, Keith; Rose, Andrea; Haworth-Booth, Mark (1992), One foot has not yet reached the next street, The British Council, ISBN 978-0-86355-144-4
- Moffat, Curtis; Barnes, Martin, 1971-, (editor.); Haworth-Booth, Mark, (writer of supplementary textual content.); Stevenson, James, (writer of supplementary textual content.) (2016), Curtis Moffat : silver society : experimental photography and design, 1923-1935 (First ed.), Göttingen, Germany Steidl London V&A Museum, ISBN 978-3-95829-027-3
- Gill, Stephen; Haworth-Booth, Mark (2005), Invisible (1st ed.), Nobody, ISBN 978-0-9549405-0-8
- Haworth-Booth, Mark; Kauffer, E. McKnight (Edward McKnight), 1890-1954 (1979), E. McKnight Kauffer : a designer and his public, Gordon Fraser Gallery, ISBN 978-0-86092-034-2
- Martin, Paul; Haworth-Booth, Mark (1988), A Yarmouth holiday, Nishen, ISBN 978-1-85378-104-9
- Goldblatt, David; Haworth-Booth, Mark; Danelzik-Brüggemann, Christoph; Stevenson, Michael, 1966- (2005), David Goldblatt : South African : intersections, Prestel, ISBN 978-3-7913-3247-5
- Haworth-Booth, Mark; Young, Michael (1988), Assignments 2 : the British Press Photographers' Association yearbook, Phaidon Press, ISBN 978-0-7148-2563-2
- Barnes, Martin; Haworth-Booth, Mark (2001), Benjamin Brecknell Turner : rural England through a Victorian lens, V&A Publications, ISBN 978-1-85177-335-0
- Derges, Susan; Haworth-Booth, Mark; Cotton, Charlotte (1999), Susan Derges : woman thinking river, Fraenkel Gallery; New York : Danziger Gallery, ISBN 978-1-881337-06-5
- Haworth-Booth, Mark; Brandt, Bill (1975), The Land : twentieth century landscape photographs, Gordon Fraser Gallery, ISBN 978-0-900406-71-3
- Phillips, Sandra S; Haworth-Booth, Mark; Squiers, Carol, 1948- (1997), Police pictures : the photograph as evidence, San Francisco Museum of Modern Art, ISBN 978-0-8118-1984-8
- Haworth-Booth, Mark (1989), Photography now, Dirk Nishen in association with the Victoria & Albert Museum, ISBN 978-1-85378-012-7
- Haworth-Booth, Mark (1991), The Origins of British photography, Thames and Hudson, ISBN 978-0-500-41082-0
- Brandt, Bill; Haworth-Booth, Mark (1951), Literary Britain (New ed.), Aperture (published 1986), ISBN 978-0-905209-66-1
- Goldblatt, David; Stevenson, Michael, (writer of added commentary.); Haworth-Booth, Mark, (contributor.) (2014), Regarding intersections (First revised Steidl ed.), Steidl, ISBN 978-3-86930-714-5
- Bonnell, Sian; Gooding, Mel; Haworth-Booth, Mark (2004), Sian Bonnell : From an Elsewhere Unknown, Ffotogallery [and] Hirschl Contemporary Art, ISBN 978-1-872771-51-9
- Haworth-Booth, Mark; Scherf, Jone Elissa; St. Andrews, George; Frans Halsmuseum (2001), Making your dreams come true : young British photography, Hatje Cantz Verlag, ISBN 978-3-7757-1119-7
- Haworth-Booth, Mark; Weston, Edward, 1886-1958 (1977), Edward Weston, Arts Council, ISBN 978-0-7287-0126-7
- Dolron, Desiree; Haworth-Booth, Mark; Assouline, Pierre (2006), Desiree Dolron : exaltation, gaze, xteriors, Éditions Xavier Barral : Institut néerlandais, ISBN 978-2-915173-15-4
- Pauli, Lori; Haworth-Booth, Mark; Torosian, Michael, 1952-; Baker, Kenneth, 1946-; Burtynsky, Edward, 1955- (2003), Manufactured landscapes : the photographs of Edward Burtynsky, National Gallery of Canada in association with Yale University Press, ISBN 978-0-300-09943-0
- Cohen, Morton N. (Morton Norton); Carroll, Lewis, 1832-1898; Flukinger, Roy, 1947-; Haworth-Booth, Mark (1998), Reflections in a looking glass : a centennial celebration of Lewis Carroll, photographer (1st ed.), Aperture Foundation, ISBN 978-0-89381-796-1
- Chadwick, Helen; Warner, Marina, 1946-; Buck, Louisa; Mellor, David; Haworth-Booth, Mark (1996), Stilled lives : Helen Chadwick, Portfolio Gallery; Odense, Denmark : Kunsthallen Brandts klædefabrik, ISBN 978-0-9520608-3-3
- Haworth-Booth, Mark; McCauley, Anne (1998), The museum & the photograph : collecting photography at the Victoria and Albert Museum, 1853-1900, Sterling and Francine Clark Art Institute, ISBN 978-0-931102-40-0
- Hockney, David; Hockney, David; Haworth-Booth, Mark (1983), Hockney's photographs, Arts Council of Great Britain, ISBN 978-0-7287-0382-7
- Hoppé, E. O. (Emil Otto); Haworth-Booth, Mark (2006), Hoppé's London (Limited ed.), Guiding Light, ISBN 978-0-9551863-0-1
- Bohm, Dorothy; Haworth-Booth, Mark; Bohm-Duchen, Monica (1998), Walls and windows, Lund Humphries, ISBN 978-0-85331-718-0
- Bradford, Richard; Haworth-Booth, Mark, (writer of foreword.) (26 October 2015), The importance of elsewhere : Philip Larkin's photographs, Frances Lincoln Limited (published 2015), ISBN 978-0-7112-3631-8
- Davidson, Bruce (2005), England/ Scotland, 1960 (1st ed.), Steidl; London : Thames & Hudson [distributor], ISBN 978-3-86521-127-9
- Brandt, Bill (1977), Ombre de lumière : photographies, Chêne

=== With essays by ===
- Bush, Andrew (1989), Bonnettstown, H.N. Abrams, ISBN 978-0-8109-0748-5
- Jack, Ian (2006), On the road again : where travel writing went next, Granta Publications, ISBN 978-0-903141-86-4 (Essay: Homage to mount desert island : a small resort, but there's so much to do)
- Weaver, Mike (25 August 1989), British photography in the nineteenth century : the fine art tradition, Cambridge University Press (published 1989), ISBN 978-0-521-34119-6 (Essay: Benjamin Brecknell Turner : Photographic views from nature)
- Weinberg, Adam D; Gilman, Sondra; Wiggins, Marianne; Roalf, Peggy; Moore, Marianne, 1887-1972. When I buy pictures (1998), From the heart : the power of photography, a collector's choice (1st ed.), Art Museum of South Texas; [New York, N.Y.] : Aperture, ISBN 978-0-89381-809-8 (Preface)
- Baltz, Lewis; Turrell, Julia Brown; Heiferman, Marvin (1990), Rule without exception, University of New Mexico Press in association with the Des Moines Art Center, ISBN 978-0-8263-1269-3 (Essay: San Quentin Point)
- Newhall, Beaumont, 1908-1993; Walch, Peter (Peter S.), 1940-; Barrow, Thomas F (1986), Perspectives on photography : essays in honor of Beaumont Newhall (1st ed.), University of New Mexico Press, ISBN 978-0-8263-0863-4 (Essay: A Connoisseur of the art of photography in the 1850s: The Rev. C. H. Townsend)
- Benton, Charlotte; Benton, Tim, 1945-; Wood, Ghislaine (2003), Art deco 1910-1939, V&A (published 2005), ISBN 978-1-85177-388-6 (Essay: Photography and the new vision)
- Aynsley, Jeremy; Atkinson, Harriet (November 2009), The Banham lectures : essays on designing the future (English ed.), Berg (published 2009), ISBN 978-1-84788-302-5 (Essay: Reyner Banham and photography)
- Bann, Stephen (2011), Art and the early photographic album, National Gallery of Art; New Haven [Conn.] : Distributed by Yale University Press, ISBN 978-0-300-13590-9 (Essay: Camille Silvy : the photography of works of art as record and restoration)
- Alpine journal (v. 114, Ernest press (published 2010), 10 March 2010, ISBN 978-0-948153-94-5 (Essay: The Return of Vittorio Sella)
- Hoozee, Robert (2007), British vision : observation and imagination in British art, 1750-1950, Mercatorfonds; Ghent, [Belgium] : Museum voor Schone Kunsten, 2007, ISBN 978-90-6153-748-9 (Essay Roger Fenton, Double Bridge on the Machno)(Essay Bill Brandt, Young Housewife, Bethnal Green, 1937)

== Collections ==
Haworth-Booth's work is held in the following permanent collection:

- National Portrait Gallery, London: 18 Polaroid prints (as of June 2020)

== See also ==
- Adrian Hardy Haworth

== Arms ==
Coat of arms of Mark Haworth-Booth

Adopted
1869
Crest
(1) A figure representing St Catherine robed and crowned as a queen kneeling affrontée, in the dexter hand a Catherine Wheel, in the sinister hand a Sword supported the point downwards all proper (for BOOTH(ancient));
(2) A stag’s head gules attired or gorged with a collar of roses argent (for HAWORTH).
Escutcheon
Quarterly, 1st and 4th, Argent three Boars’ Heads erect and erased Sable (for BOOTH);
2nd and 3rd, Azure on a Bend between two Stags’ Heads couped Or a Longbow of the Field (for HAWORTH).
Motto
Quod ero spero ("I will be what I wish to be")
