= UTC Sheffield City Centre =

Location
- 111 Matilda Street; Sheffield, South Yorkshire, S1 4QF; England; 53.3752°N 1.4672°W

Information
- Type: University Technical College
- Motto: Be creative, Be industrious
- Established: September 2013
- Trust: Sheffield UTC Academy Trust
- Department for Education URN: 139695 Tables
- Ofsted: Reports
- Principal: Alex Reynolds
- Age: 13 to 19
- Enrolment: 460
- Capacity: 600
- Public transport: B P Granville Road
- Website: city.utcsheffield.org.uk

UTC Sheffield City Centre (known as UTC Sheffield from 2013 to 2016) is a University Technical College (UTC) that opened in Sheffield City Centre, South Yorkshire, England in September 2013. The site for the UTC was purchased by Sheffield City Council, with capital funding of £9.9 million awarded by the Department for Education for new buildings. The sponsors of the UTC include Sheffield Hallam University and The Sheffield College in Sheffield.

== Description ==
UTC Sheffield opened in September 2013. The University Technical College (UTC) is funded by the Department for Education and co-sponsored by Sheffield Hallam University, The Sheffield College and Sheffield Chamber of Commerce and Industry. It is governed by the Sheffield UTC Academy Trust. It differs from a secondary school as it offers technical qualifications either in creative and digital media or advanced engineering and manufacturing, alongside GCSEs and A Levels. Pupils study their technical subject for a substantial proportion of the week. The college day is longer than in most secondary schools.

There is a higher proportion of boys than girls. The proportion of disadvantaged students supported by pupil premium funding, and pupils from minority ethnic backgrounds is average while the proportion of pupils who have special educational needs or disability is well above average. In 2015, the UTC met the government's floor standards, which are the minimum expectations for pupils’ attainment and progress at GCSE.

== Admissions ==
UTC Sheffield City Centre had an initial intake of students aged 14 and 16 (academic years 10 and 12) in 2013, but has expanded to accommodate students aged 13 to 19 (academic years 9 and 13). The primary catchment area of the UTC is the Sheffield City Region. Where the number of applications for admission to the UTC is greater than the number of places, a proportion of places are awarded to students from each district within the city region.

== Curriculum ==
UTC Sheffield City Centre specialises in advanced engineering and manufacturing and creative and digital media. Pupils study for a diploma in one of the specialised areas – either engineering and manufacturing, or creative and digital media. Pupils also study a core range of GCSEs. Sixth form students also choose between the two specialisms and take a diploma with at least two A Levels. The choice of specialism determines the A Levels on offer to the student.
