= Ian Roome =

British Liberal Democrat politician

Ian Roome MP
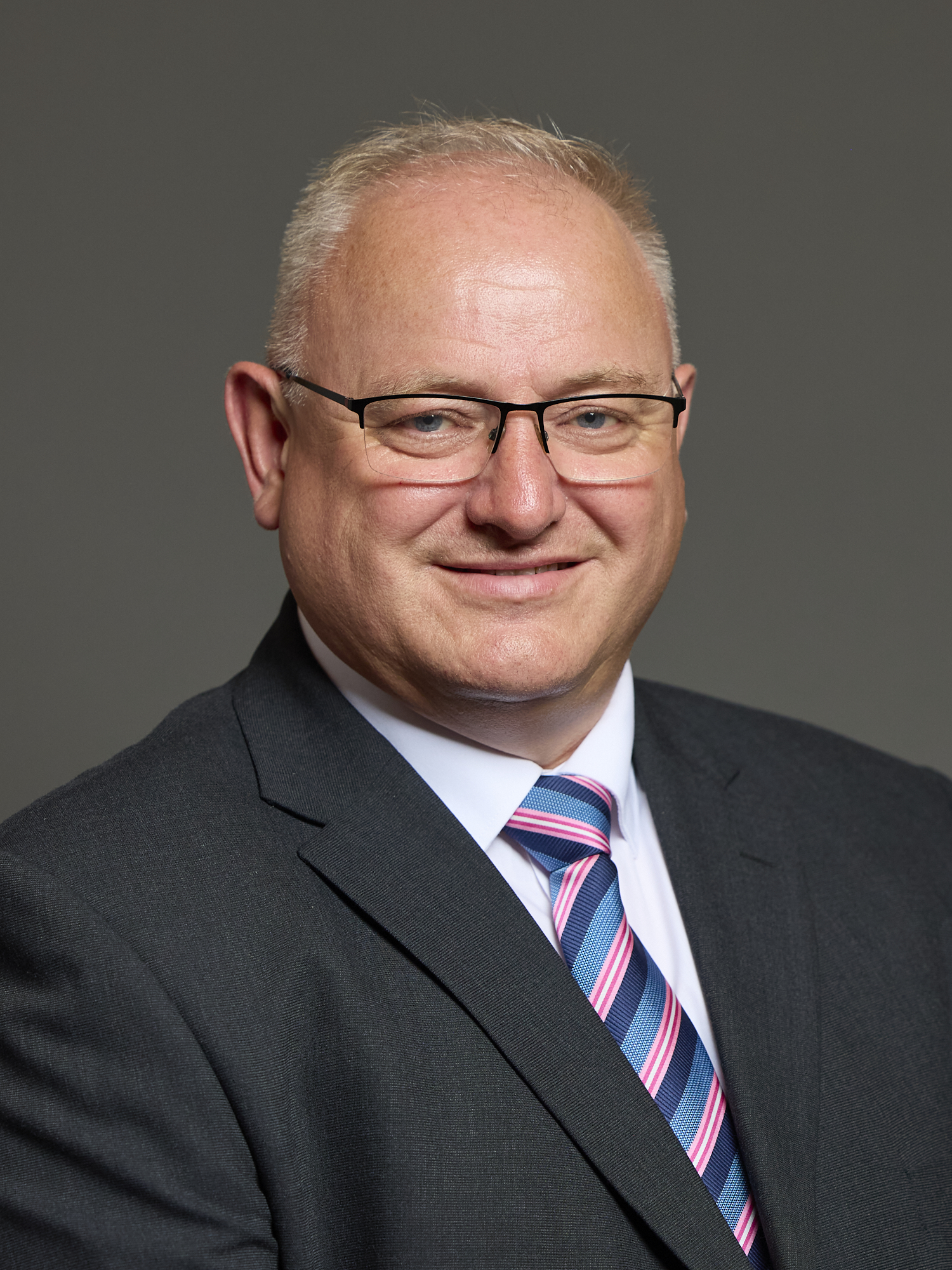
- Official portrait, 2024

Member of Parliament for North Devon
- Incumbent
- Assumed office 4 July 2024
- Preceded by: Selaine Saxby
- Majority: 6,744 (13.1%)

Councillor for Devon County Council
- In office 7 May 2021 – 1 May 2025
- Preceded by: Brian Carol
- Succeeded by: Syed Jusef
- Majority: 662 (19.7%)

Councillor for North Devon District Council
- In office 7 May 2015 – 1 May 2025
- Preceded by: Colin James Payne
- Succeeded by: Loki Gareth Phillip Dawson
- Majority: 1037 (4.2%)

Personal details
- Born: 1968 (age 57–58) Sheffield, Yorkshire, England
- Party: Liberal Democrats
- Children: 2
- Education: Chaucer Comprehensive School
- Website: www.northdevonlibdems.org.uk/ian-roome

Ian Roome (/ruːm/) is a British Liberal Democrat politician who was elected as the Member of Parliament for North Devon in the 2024 United Kingdom general election.

He previously served for two terms as Mayor of Barnstaple.

== Early life and career ==
Roome was born and raised in Sheffield, attending Chaucer Comprehensive School from 1979 to 1985.

After leaving school, Roome joined the Royal Air Force in 1986, serving across the United Kingdom, as well as in Germany at RAF Laarbruch. He first came to North Devon in 1989, after being posted to RAF Chivenor. Later, while serving as Mayor of Barnstaple in 2018, he would help to keep RM Chivenor operational, lobbying the Defence Secretary to keep the base open, after it was announced in 2016 that it could be facing potential closure.

After leaving the Royal Air Force Roome worked in mental health nursing at North Devon District Hospital, after which he decided to work as a community mental health worker across North Devon.

== Political career ==
Roome began his political career in 2003, serving as a Councillor for Barnstaple Town Council. During his time as a Barnstaple Town Councillor he held numerous notable positions, such as Mayor of Barnstaple and Chair of the Staff Committee. In 2011, during his tenure as a Barnstaple Town Councillor, he founded and managed a £2.5 million fundraising campaign to build a Chemotherapy and Day Treatment Unit at the North Devon District Hospital. He also managed an additional £1.5 million capital campaign to build a Cancer and Wellbeing unit at the North Devon District Hospital.

Roome was first elected to represent Yeo Valley on the North Devon District Council in May 2015. He was re-elected in May 2019 to represent Barnstaple with Pilton Ward, which he continued to represent until 1 May 2025 when he was replaced by Cllr Loki Dawson. He was Leader of the Council and Liberal Democrat Group from 18 May 2023 until 26 July 2024 when he was replaced with Cllr David Clayton as leader of the Council and Cllr Helen Walker as leader of the North Devon Liberal Democrats.

Roome was elected to represent Barnstaple North on the Devon County Council in May 2021 and represented the area until he was replaced by fellow Lib Dem Councillor Syed Jusef on 1 May 2025. He continues to serve on the Devon & Somerset Fire & Rescue Authority, which he has done since he was elected to the Council in 2021.

Roome was selected for North Devon Liberal Democrats as the Potential Parliamentary Candidate on 26 Dec 2022 and was successfully elected as North Devon MP in the 2024 General election 4 July 2024.

Roome was chosen alongside another Lib Dem MP to be given a seat on the House of Commons Defence Select Committee on 23 Oct 2024.
