= Chaucer School, Sheffield =

Chaucer School
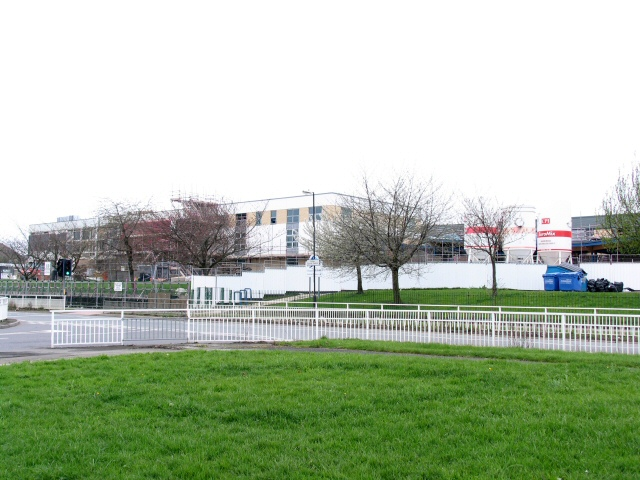
- The school during refurbishment (2006)

Location
- Wordsworth Avenue; Sheffield, South Yorkshire, S5 8NH; England; 53°25′35″N 1°29′14″W

Information
- Type: Academy
- Motto: Learning Together, Achieving Together
- Established: 1958
- Local authority: City of Sheffield
- Trust: Tapton School Academy Trust
- Department for Education URN: 138414 Tables
- Ofsted: Reports
- Headteacher: Joanna Crewe
- Gender: Coeducational
- Age: 11 to 16
- Enrolment: 900
- Website: www.chaucer.sheffield.sch.uk

As of 31 August 2026 Chaucer school closed. The site reopened on 1 September 2026 as Mercia Northridge School as part of Mercia Learning Trust

Chaucer School was a secondary school with academy status in the Parson Cross area of Sheffield, South Yorkshire, England. Named after Geoffrey Chaucer, the school became Sheffield's third comprehensive school (after Myers Grove School and Hinde House School) in 1964, on two sites separated by a field, one newly built. These were made up of the west building (Top) located on Halifax Road and the east building (Bottom) on Wordsworth Avenue.

By 2005, these buildings were old and in need of refurbishment, and all of the staff, students and resources were moved into the "bottom" building which underwent internal and external improvement including the erection of a new sports hall and drama and music rooms.

The new school re-opened in September 2006 as Chaucer Business And Enterprise College, one of only 17 English schools formally authorised to adopt Building Schools for the Future (BSF) status. The specialist school, now with over 1000 pupils in the 11 to 16 age-group had undergone a £15 million transformation to upgrade services and infrastructure.

Chaucer was part of the Tapton School Academy Trust.
