= The Sheffield College =

Further education college in Sheffield, South Yorkshire, England

Coordinates: 53.382°N 1.464°W

- Sheffield, South Yorkshire, S2 2RL; England

Information
- Type: Further Education, Higher Education
- Established: 1993
- Local authority: South Yorkshire Mayoral Combined Authority
- Principal: Angela Foulkes
- Staff: 1,300
- Gender: Mixed
- Age: 16 to adult
- Enrolment: 13,500 (including 2,501 apprentices (2020/21)
- Slogan: "Go Further" "Transforming lives through learning"
- Ofsted Report Result: "Good"
- Public transit (City Campus): B P Granville Road / The Sheffield College
- Website: www.sheffcol.ac.uk

The Sheffield College is a large general further education college in Sheffield, England. The college has six campuses across the city and has 13,500 students enrolled (including 2,501 apprentices) as of 2021. It provides academic, technical and vocational training for school leavers and adults from across the South Yorkshire Mayoral Combined Authority region.

== History ==
The college is the sole provider of post-16 education in the north of Sheffield, following the abolition of traditional sixth-forms in 1988 by the tertiary system. The current college was founded in 1992, following the merger of six different tertiary colleges, namely: Castle, Loxley, Norton, Parkwood, Parson Cross and Stradbroke. In May 1995, the college was described as being the biggest in Britain and had over 33,000 students enrolled at the time, of which almost 7,000 were full-time students. In 2003, the college launched a new 'federal structure', a reorganisation that 'sought to create a greater voice for students and a better organisational structure for its workforce'. In 2014, the now-closed Norton campus served as a filming location for the television series This Is England '90.

== Courses ==
The college offers a variety of courses at the following levels:

- School Leavers - Entry to Level 3 (NVQ Level 1–3; GCSEs to A-Levels)
- Access to University - Level 3 (NVQ Level 3; A-Levels)
- Career Progression/Adult - Level 3 to Level 7 (NVQ Level 3–7; A levels to postgraduate level)
- University Level - Level 4 to 7 (NVQ Level 4–7; A levels to postgraduate level)

The college offers courses in the following subjects: Animal care, Automotive engineering, aviation, tourism & events, business, catering & hospitality, childcare & education, civil engineering, construction & building trades, design & visual arts, engineering, ESOL, games design, hair & beauty, health & social care, inclusion, IT & computing, land-based studies, medial, journalism & photography, performing arts & music, science, dental & pharmacy, sport, taxi driving and uniformed public services.

In September 2012, more than 200 taxi drivers completed the first course of its kind designed to train prospective drivers in customer service skills. In October 2012, the college launched an online Human Trafficking Uncovered course, the first of its kind designed for those working in the public, private and voluntary sectors. In December 2014, singer JB Gill was recruited by the college as the public face of a two-year vocational performing arts course. The course was part of a portfolio of courses to help address a skills shortage in the creative industries.

In September 2012, the closure of a press photographers' course raised concerns about the future of regional newspaper staff photography. The course had been running uninterrupted at Norton College since 1979.

== Campuses ==
The college has main campuses at City, Hillsborough, Olive Grove and Peaks.

=== City ===
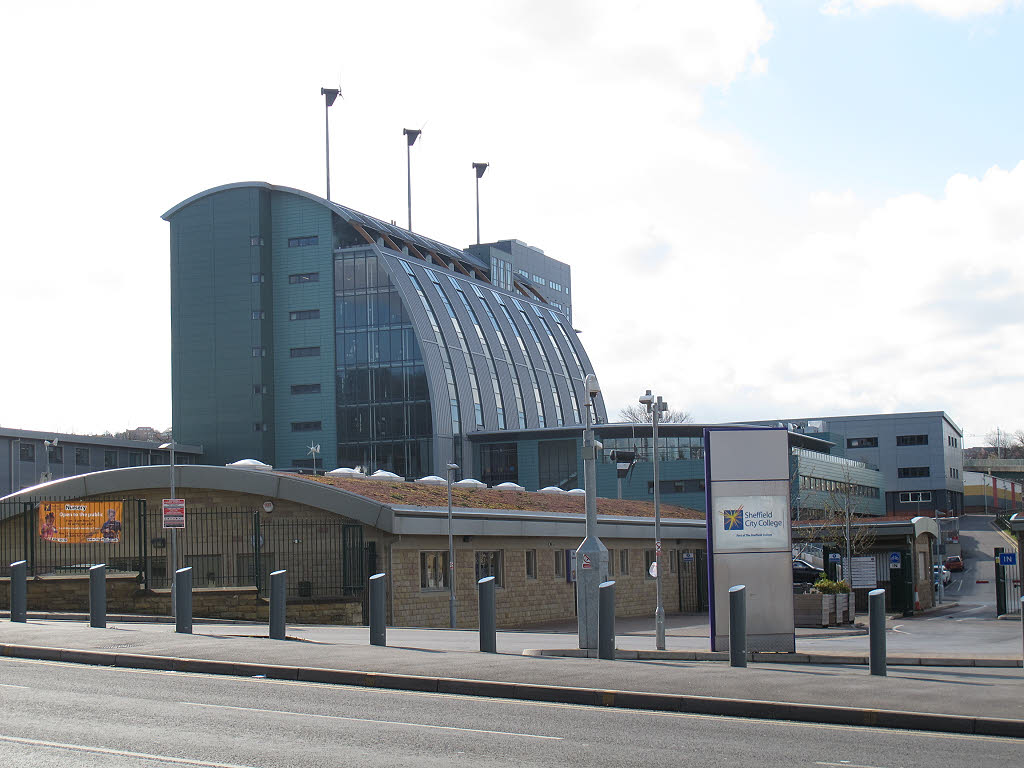
The rebuilt City College (2012)

In 2010, Sheffield City College underwent a £60 million rebuild programme to create an environmentally-friendly, single-site campus. The site provides vocational subjects including areas such as hair and beauty, catering, business and construction. The building features three roof-mounted 15-metre-tall (49 ft) wind turbines. Energy from the turbines is fed back into a distribution system for the college's tower block. The college also has solar panels and rainwater recycling facilities.

In August 2017, the campus was temporarily evacuated and closed due to a faulty fire alarm system.

=== Hillsborough ===
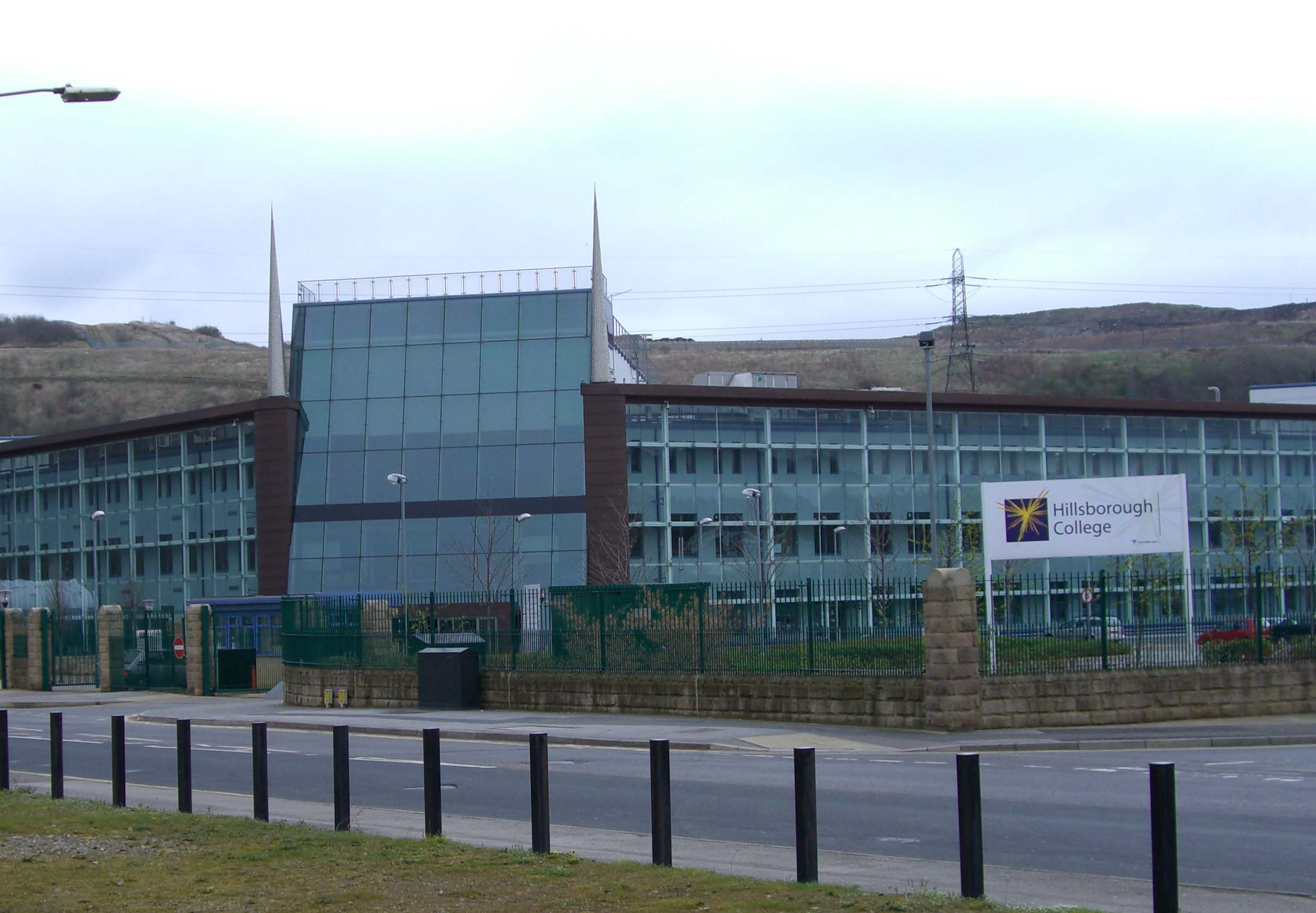
New Hillsborough campus (2008)

In June 2001, the college announced plans to replace two of its centres, based at Parson Cross and in Loxley, with a single campus in Hillsborough that would serve 1,800 students across the north of Sheffield. The plans received criticism from some, suggesting that there was 'inequality in education in the city'. In November 2003, construction began on the £27 million campus, with the building completed in 2005. The site includes sports facilities, 14 art and design studios and 12 ICT workshops.

It was proposed that the former Loxley site be replaced with up to 74 homes, but the proposals had encountered difficulty after the college had been unable to convince the local authority that the homes were appropriate for the area. In August 2007, plans for 79 houses and 29 apartments were judged to 'fall short' in terms of design, layout and appearance.

Following the closure of the Norton campus, all courses were relocated to the Hillsborough campus in September 2015. The campus was one of the oldest Sheffield College site, with parts dating back to the 1950s. The courses were relocated to a new £8.8 million centre and the former site was proposed to be redeveloped into a supermarket.

== University Technical Colleges (UTC) ==
The Sheffield College sponsors UTC Sheffield Academy Trust which operates three university technical colleges (two in Sheffield and one in Derby). The college is a member and sponsor of the trust and provides it with business support services.

=== UTC Sheffield City Centre ===
The first, opened in September 2013, specialises in technical studies and offers 250 pupils training in the engineering and digital sectors. The scheme had been approved in August 2012 and construction began in September 2012. The project was said to have cost £8.5 million. The college building was nominated for the Royal Institute of British Architects' (RIBA) regional award in April 2015, after the building had been remodelled and refurbished with an aim to retain features of the original structure, which was built in 1902.

=== UTC Sheffield Olympic Legacy Park ===
A second, produced in partnership with Sheffield Hallam University, saw the unveiling of a £10 million college in September 2016, based on the site of the former Don Valley Stadium. The UTC specialises in sports science, healthcare and well-being and had been approved by Sheffield City Council in September 2015. The college employs 56 people and serves 600 pupils aged between 14 and 19. The plan had initially been rejected by the British Government in January 2014 but was eventually approved in August 2014 after the bid was resubmitted.

=== UTC Derby Pride Park ===
The UTC site ib Derby opened in 2015 as Derby Manufacturing UTC. It was launched as partnership between Derby College, University of Derby, Rolls-Royce, Bombardier and Toyota. After poor results in its 2017 and subsequent OFSTED inspections it transferred to the Sheffield UTC Academy Trust and focused in engineering, later added a specialism in life sciences in 2020.

== Subsidiaries ==
The Sheffield college owns and operates three wholly owned subsidiaries which provide specific services for the college.

- Sparks Managed Services Ltd. which provides nursery, cleaning, catering and facilities support to the college and Sheffield UTC Academy Trust.
- Sparks Teaching Services Ltd. which provides temporary teachers and other staff.
- Sparks Solutions Ltd. provides marketing, and business development services to the college.

== Results ==
In August 2009, the college reported a pass rate of 96.9 per cent, with those achieving A to B grades at 34.4 per cent. In August 2016, the college reported a 93 per cent A-Level pass rate, with 23 per cent of grades at A* to B. This was down from the scores of 2015, which were 94 and 23 per cent respectively.

In February 2016, Ofsted marked the college as 'requiring improvement', following an inspection. Inspectors had found failings in leadership, teaching, attainment, personal development and both 16 to 19 and adult education programmes.

In August 2017, the National Student Survey (NSS) awarded the college with an 86 per cent satisfaction rate, a score higher than the national average of 84 per cent.

== Students' Union ==
The Sheffield College Students' Union (SCSU) reportedly represents around 25,000 students at the college every year. Every student automatically becomes a member of the union upon enrollment.

== Notable alumni ==
- Richard Caborn
- David Blunkett
- George W. Buckley
- Jeremy Clarkson
- Kat Fletcher
- Debra Gray
- Richard McCourt
- Stephen Slater
- John Sweeney (journalist)

== See also ==
- The Online College
