= Chesterfield College =

Further education school in Derbyshire, England

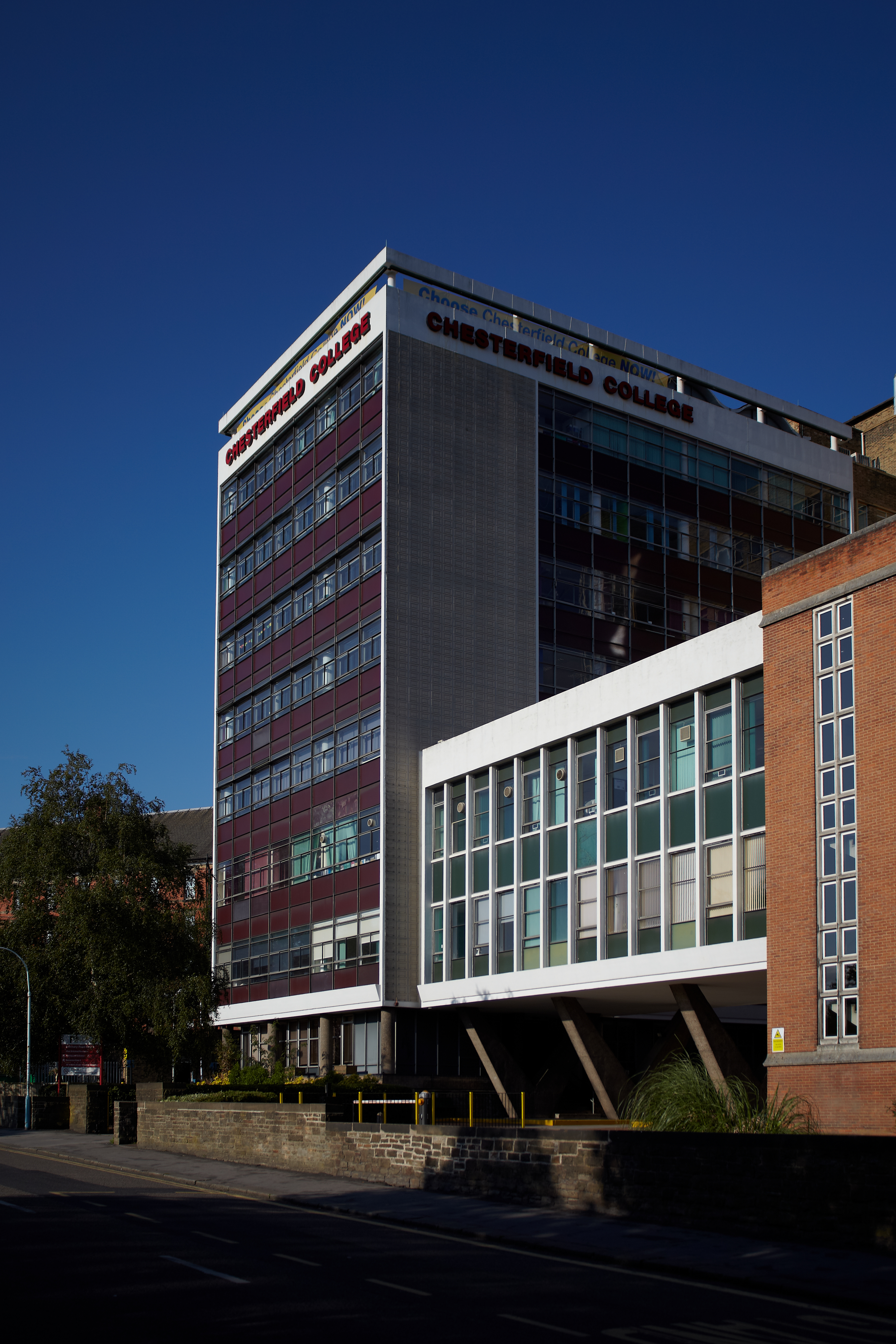
- South block of Chesterfield College

Location
- Infirmary Road; Chesterfield, Derbyshire, S41 7NG; England
- 53°14′22″N 1°25′28″W

Information
- Type: Further education
- Local authority: Derbyshire County Council
- Department for Education URN: 130638 Tables
- Ofsted: Reports
- Principal and CEO: Julie Richards
- Gender: Mixed
- Age range: Any Age From 16
- Enrolment: 21,000+
- Website: www.chesterfield.ac.uk

Chesterfield College is a further and higher education college in the town of Chesterfield in North East Derbyshire, England. The main college campus is based at Infirmary Road Chesterfield. The college also has a satellite site in Derby. It serves over 21,000 students of which 5,600 are full-time attends.

== History ==
The building where the college is on Infirmary Road started life as a cheese factory in 1841 before it became Chesterfield and Brampton Mechanics' Institute. From the late 1940s until the early 1960s the building housed all the facilities for Construction trades training up to City and Guilds Final Examinations. Similarly there were courses to Ordinary and Higher level National Certificates in Building. Later it went through various incarnations, including the merger in 1984 of Chesterfield Art College and Chesterfield College of Technology, before becoming Chesterfield College. Chesterfield College become the first Associate College of Sheffield Hallam University in 1993.

Chesterfield College of Art ran independently for many years providing creative courses in a variety of subjects: Fine Art (painting and Sculpture), Graphics, Printmaking, Furniture Design, Interior Design, Exhibition Design, Townscape, Painting and Decorating, Photography, Fashion Design, Hairdressing and Beauty Therapy. It also ran courses in vehicle refinishing, industrial painting, signwriting and upholstery techniques in buildings at the Hasland site, where students attended one full day and two nights for four years.

The Art College's main building was Penmore House at Hasland but other centres were at the converted flour mill on Lordsmill Street and buildings on Sheffield Road.

Most courses offered a wide creative education with lessons across all disciplines for a two-year foundation course. Visiting lecturers or film histories were a weekly event as was one day dedicated to General Studies. Students were expected stay for evening classes until 7.30pm for three nights per week. At least one of those evenings had to be an attendance at the Life Drawing class.

Those students who did not move on to Diploma (then the equivalent of a degree) in Art and Design Courses (Dip. A.D.) at other colleges stayed at Chesterfield for vocational courses: courses related to the Society of Industrial Artists and Designers (now the Chartered Society of Designers) or City and Guild Diplomas.

Community courses existed as did Saturday morning classes for pre-college students.

The College still offers a wide range of open and flexible learning courses for people who have home commitments such as caring responsibilities and want to study at home, shift workers who cannot attend classes, those who would like to update their qualifications or people who want to gain further qualifications.

== Campuses ==
Chesterfield College consists of three campuses over the town of Chesterfield which are used by the college to tutor students for different courses. The main campus is on Infirmary Road and is where most of the students learn, as well as being home to the Advice and Guidance Centre and the administrative centre of the College. This campus has a North Blocks, South Block Tower, East Block Engineering Workshops and West Block and Wharf Lane Workshops. The Infirmary Road site is where the majority of the courses take place. A smaller campus is at the Queen's Park Leisure Centre

The college has a satellite site in Derby. This offers training and arranges apprenticeships.

== Beacon College status ==
Chesterfield College has been awarded Learning and Skills Beacon Status for excellence in community-based education. This award was launched by the Department for Education and Skills and the Learning and Skills Council in 2002. This award was presented to the College in London on 15 March 2005.

== Lifelong Learning Network ==
Chesterfield College is a partner institution of Higher Futures, the Lifelong Learning Network (LLN) for South Yorkshire, North Derbyshire and North Nottinghamshire.

== Current courses and subjects ==
- A Levels and GCSEs
- Art and Design
- Automobile Engineering
- Vehicle Accident Repair and paint
- Business
- Childcare
- Computing, Information Technology
- Construction
- Electrical Engineering
- Hairdressing and Beauty Therapy
- Health and Caring
- Hospital and Caring
- Logistics and Supply Chain Management
- Learning with Learning Difficulties
- Performing Arts
- Plumbing
- Science
- Sport and Recreation
- Travel and Tourism
- Uniformed Services
- Work-based Learning
- Hospitality and Catering

== Notable alumni ==
- Jo Guest, model
- Thomas Greatorex, musician.
- Ant Plate, musician and producer.
- Ismail Chirine, Egypt Defense Minister
