= Barnsley College =

Further education college in Barnsley, England

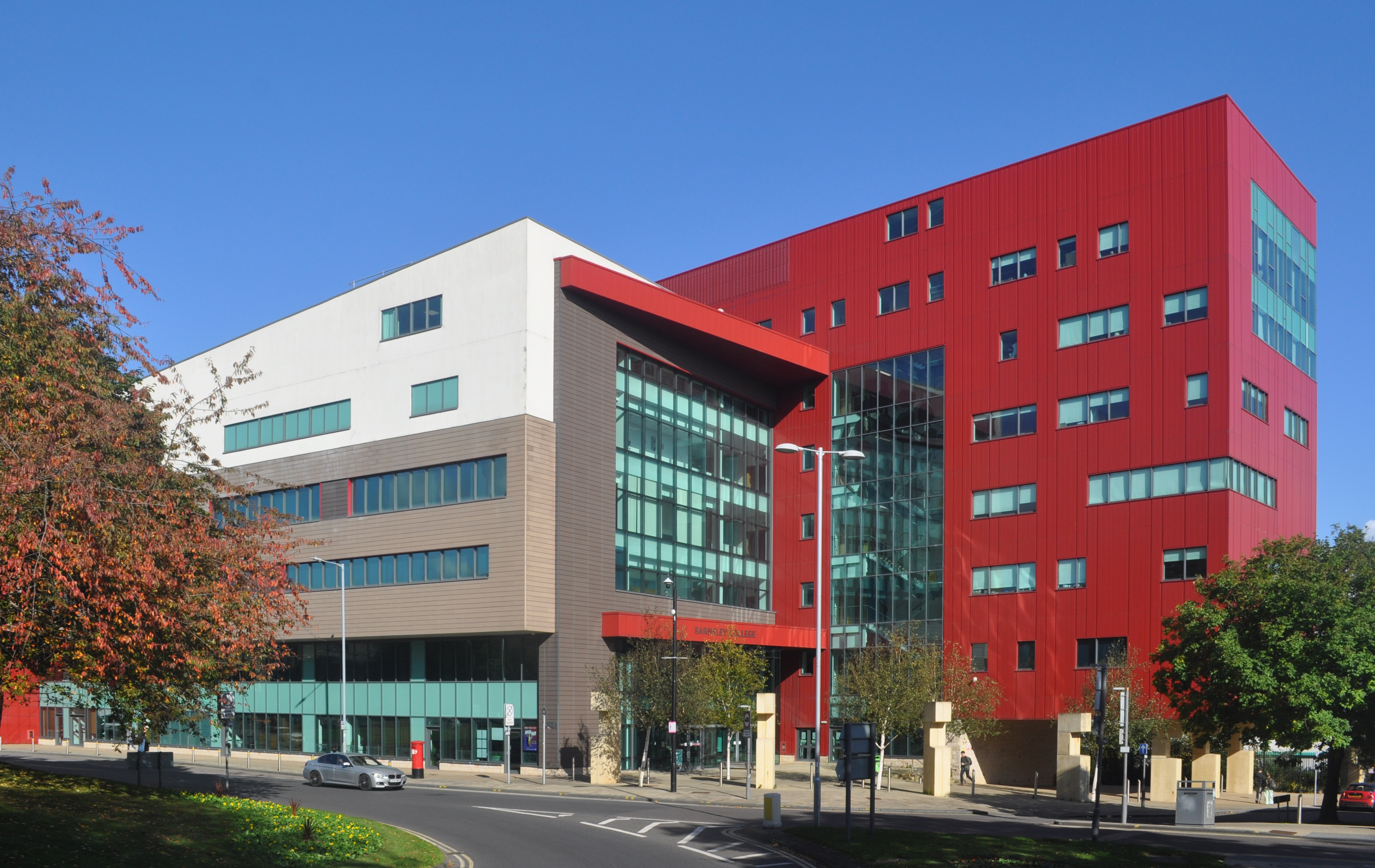

Location
- Church Street; Barnsley, South Yorkshire, S70 2YW; England
- Coordinates: 53.5548°N 1.4825°W

Information
- Type: Further education college
- Motto: Transforming Lives
- Local authority: Barnsley
- Department for Education URN: 130524 Tables
- Ofsted: Reports
- Principal: Mr David Akeroyd
- Gender: Coeducational
- Colors: Red
- Website: www.barnsley.ac.uk

Barnsley College is a further education college just outside the town centre of Barnsley, England. It has several campuses, including the SciTech Digital Innovation Centre and The Electric Theatre. The college provides A Levels, apprenticeships and vocational courses for students.

Upon its last Ofsted inspection, the college was awarded the grade of Outstanding, the highest grade available; further to this award the college was also deemed The best college in the UK by Ofsted officials.

== Campus ==
The Old Mill Lane Campus is the main campus building and it has a variety of facilities available to students, including art and design studios, catering kitchens, a simulated nursery and classroom, hair salons, beauty therapy rooms, music recording studios, a drama studio, a dance studio, and a simulated aircraft cabin.

=== SciTech Digital Innovation Hub ===
Originally opened by Sir Patrick Stewart in November 2004, the SciTech Centre was home to health sciences, social care professions and computing subjects. In 2020, an extensive refurbishment project, supported by the Department for Education and the Sheffield City Region Local Enterprise Partnership, was completed, with the aims of improving facilities and the digital curriculum within Barnsley. The campus was renamed to the SciTech Digital Innovation Hub, and now offers industry-standard, high-spec computing technology to students.

=== Honeywell Sports Campus ===
The Honeywell Sports Campus offers team sports as well as support for individual athletes. All sports courses are delivered on campus, as well as public services.

=== Construction Centre ===
The Construction Centre opened in September 2015, and accommodates students studying a range of construction trades. Facilities include workshops, a construction project workshop, break-out areas for independent study and classrooms with an IT network.

=== Science, Technology, Engineering and Maths (STEM) Centre ===
The STEM Centre offers modern facilities to students including engineering and electrical workshops, laboratory facilities and computer learning zones. The STEM Centre additionally accommodates students studying Health, Science and Social Care Professions courses.

== Lifelong Learning Network ==
Barnsley College is a partner institution of Higher Futures, the Lifelong Learning Networks (LLN) for South Yorkshire, North Derbyshire and North Nottinghamshire.

== History: incorporation ==
The 1990s incorporation of colleges brought radical changes in management style led by David Eade. Franchising on a large scale brought new funds but ultimately in 2001 financial collapse and 100+ staff redundancies (Hansard 21 June 2001: Column 226 Link) as the leadership failed to respond to changes in the funding arrangements (opinion). Stuart Spacey served a prison sentence for fraud as a consequence of actions in this period (Serious Fraud Office press release 19 April 2007 SFO).

== Notable alumni ==
- Joann Fletcher, Egyptologist and TV presenter
- Matt Helders of the indie rock group Arctic Monkeys studied music
- Stephanie Hirst radio presenter most notably for time at Capital Yorkshire.
- Gary Jarman, bassist of the indie rock group The Cribs studied music there, but failed to finish the course.
- Ryan Jarman, front man of the indie rock group The Cribs studied music there, but failed to finish the course.
- Sam Nixon was a catering student until he entered the Pop Idol TV competition in 2003. He is now a television presenter.
- Kate Rusby attended in the early 1990s. She is now a folk singer.
- Oliver Sykes, lead vocalist in the metalcore band Bring Me the Horizon.
- Alex Turner of the indie rock group Arctic Monkeys studied music technology.

== See also ==
- List of UCAS institutions
- List of universities in the United Kingdom
