= Longley Park Sixth Form =

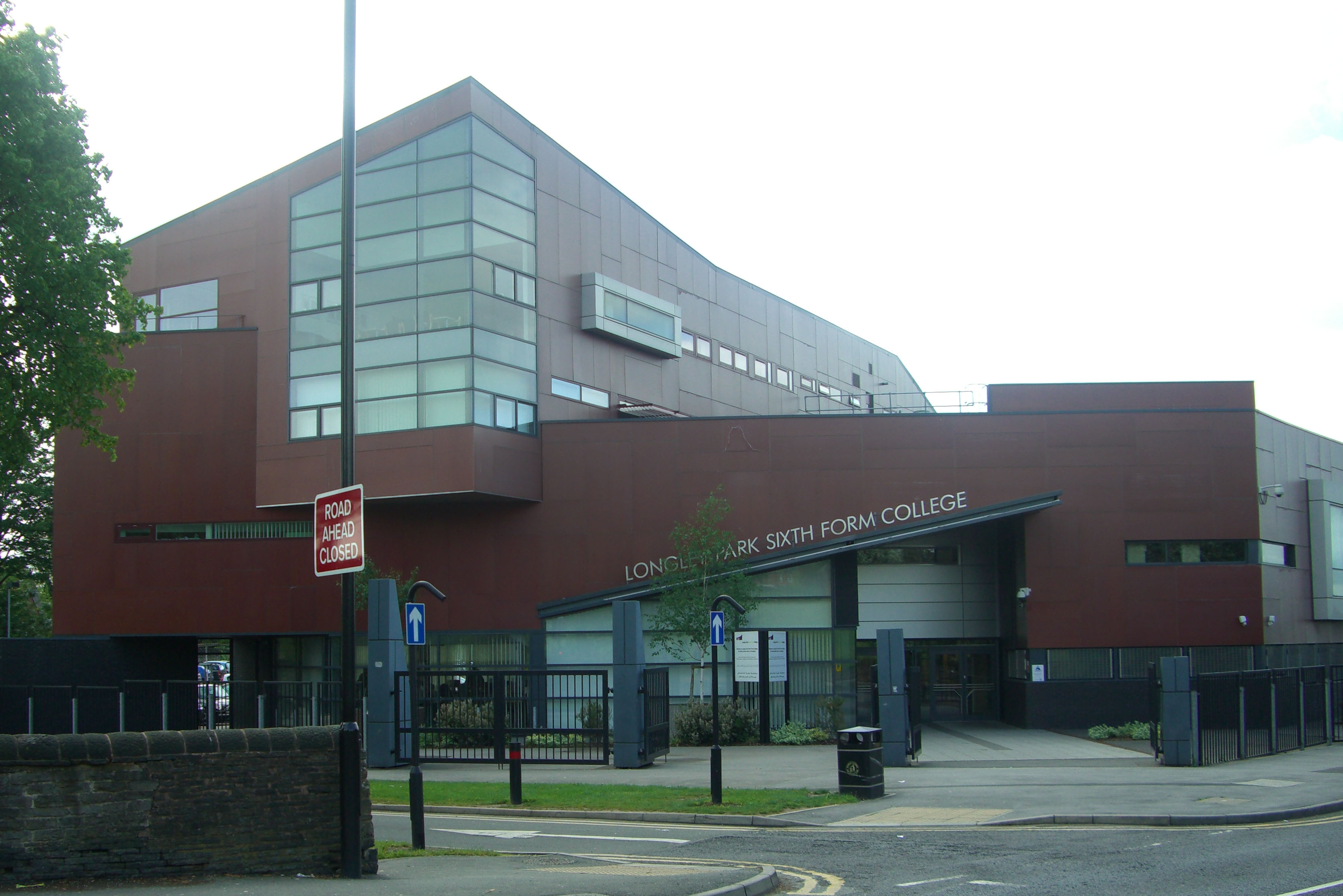
- Longley Park 6th Form

Location
- Horninglow Road; Sheffield, South Yorkshire, S5 6SG; England; 53.4180°N 1.4560°W

Information
- Type: Academy
- Motto: Stretch Your Potential
- Established: 2004
- Local authority: City of Sheffield
- Trust: Brigantia Learning Trust
- Principal: Jamie Davies
- Age: 16 to 19
- Enrolment: c. 1,200
- Website: http://www.longleypark.ac.uk/

Longley Park Sixth Form is a 16-18 academy in the Longley area of Sheffield, South Yorkshire, England. It is not to be confused with the multi-campus Sheffield College. Longley Park Sixth Form was established in 2004 with circa 1,200 students enrolled. It is part of the Brigantia Learning Trust, an academies partnership with feeder school Hinde House 3-16 School.

== History ==
It opened to the public and to students in September 2004 at a cost of £8.5 million. The sixth form has been visited by both the former Prime Minister Tony Blair and the former Home Secretary David Blunkett MP (who both opened it). It is just north of the Northern General Hospital on Barnsley Road (A6135), although the entrance is on Horninglow Road. It was designed by Ellis Williams of Preston Brook and built by Kier Northern.

In 2015 they had awards where David Blunkett was present and he visited again in July 2025 to another awards ceremony.

== Admissions ==
The Sixth Form provides a range of different courses for students between the age of 16–19 to choose at GCSE, BTEC, and A level (AS/A2).

== Facilities ==
The sixth form has many different resources. These range from Interactive whiteboards in each class room, to the Learning Resource Centre (LRC). The sixth form also has a virtual learning environment which is powered by Moodle.

== Lifelong Learning Network ==
Longley Park Sixth Form is a partner institution of Higher Futures, the Lifelong Learning Network (LLN) for South Yorkshire, north Derbyshire and north Nottinghamshire.
