= Chris Husbands =

Professor Sir Chris Husbands
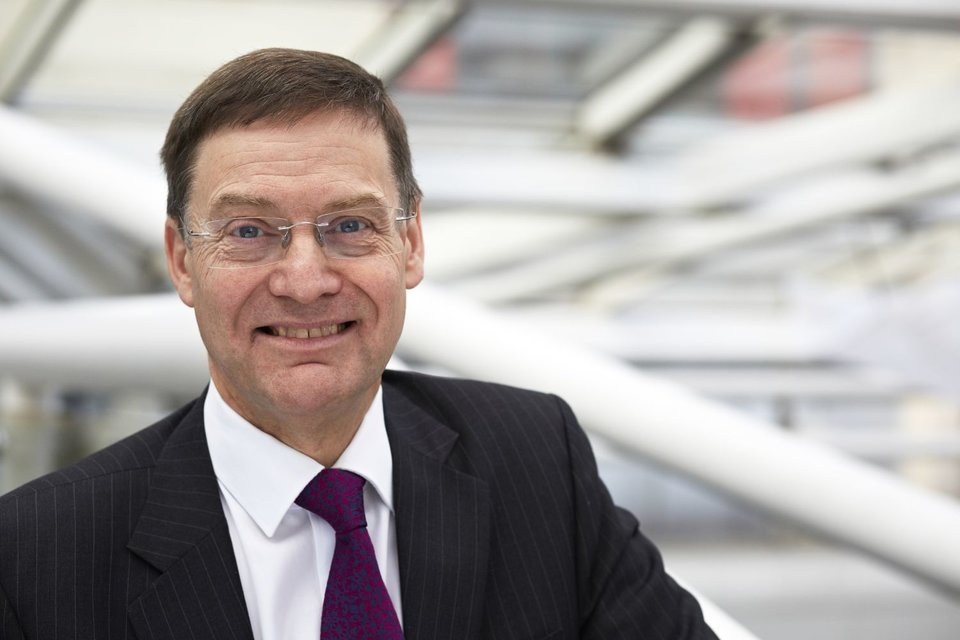
- Professor Husbands on campus at Sheffield Hallam University≠

Vice-Chancellor of Sheffield Hallam University
- In office January 2016 – December 2023
- Succeeded by: Professor Liz Mossop

Personal details
- Born: Chris Husbands; 1959 (age 66–67)
- Citizenship: British
- Occupation: University Vice Chancellor; Professor
- Years active: 1995-present
- Employer: Sheffield Hallam University
- Organizations: Universities UK; Teaching Excellence Framework; Doncaster Opportunity Area; Yorkshire Universities; Sheffield City Region Local Enterprise Board
- Notable work: TEF; Civic Universities Group
- Board member of: Training and Development Agency for Schools (2005–2012); Edexcel (2000-2003); Assessment and Qualifications Alliance (2003–2007); Universities UK (2012–2013 and 2019-)]; The Sheffield College (2016–2018); Sheffield City Region Local Enterprise Board (2017–)]; Yorkshire Universities 2016-)

Professor Sir Chris Husbands is a British academic, educationist, university leader and public servant. He was the vice-chancellor of Sheffield Hallam University between 2016 and 2023.

== Education ==
He was educated at King Edward VI College, Nuneaton, Emmanuel College, Cambridge (BA, PhD) and the Institute of Education, London University (PGCE). He was reader in education (1995–1998), professor of education (1998–2003) and director of the Institute of Education (2000–2003) at the University of Warwick, professor of research in education and head of the School of Education and Lifelong Learning at the University of East Anglia (2003–2007), and professor of education policy (2007–2015) and director (2011–2016) of the Institute of Education, University of London, which he led into merger with University College London in 2014, becoming vice provost for academic development at UCL. The Institute of Education was rated first in the world for education in the QS university rankings in 2014, 2015 and 2016, and was awarded the Queen's Anniversary Prize for Higher Education in 2015.

== Career ==
He began his working life as a teacher in urban comprehensive high schools before his career in higher education. His academic expertise lies in education policy and improvement, and particularly in policy in relation to teachers and teaching in schools. His academic work has been disseminated in fifteen books and over four hundred conference presentations and papers. He chaired the independent Skills Taskforce on UK vocational education and training policy between 2012 and 2014 and was a member of the Academies Commission (2012–3) examining the future of schools policy in England.

He was elected as a Fellow of the Academy of Social Sciences in 2011, was visiting professor in global education policy at East China Normal University and is an Honorary Fellow of Emmanuel College, Cambridge, of University College London and of the City and Guilds of London Institute.

His public service includes board memberships at the Training and Development Agency for Schools (2005–2012), Edexcel (2000–2003), the Assessment and Qualifications Alliance (2003–2007), Universities UK (2012–2013, 2018-), Sheffield College (2016–2018) and the Sheffield City Region Local Enterprise Board (2017–). He became the vice-chancellor of Sheffield Hallam University in January 2016.

In July 2016, he was appointed by the UK government to chair the Teaching Excellence Framework for UK higher education, and was appointed to a second term in 2018. In 2017 he became chair of the UK Higher Education Statistics Agency. He was chair of Yorkshire Universities between 2017 and 2020and was appointed by the secretary of state for education to chair the Doncaster Opportunity Area Board in 2017. In 2019 he joined the Hong Kong University Grants Committee's Quality Assurance Board. He was knighted for services to higher education in the 2018 Birthday Honours.

In 2022, Husbands had taken some pride in Professor Laura Murphy's critical research about human rights in China, while acknowledging that this might reduce the number of Chinese students at the university. After seven years as vice-chancellor of Sheffield Hallam University he stood down in 2023.

== Major publications ==
2020 'Leading, learning and lockdown: first thoughts on leadership and COVID-19' (Further Education Trust for Leadership)

2020 (with Natalie Day and Bob Kerslake) 'Making Universities Matter: how higher education can help to heal a divided Britain' (Higher Education Policy Institute)

2016 (with David Scott, Roger Slee and Mayumi Terano) Policy Learning and Educational Change (Sage)

2016 Voices in the air: making sense of policy and practice in education (IOE Press)

2016 (with Chris Brown and David Woods) ‘Transforming urban schooling: lessons from London’, in Paul Chua, ed., Innovations in Educational Change (New York, Springer)

2016 (with Chris Brown and David Woods) ‘Leadership to transform outcomes in one deprived urban Local Authority’ in Toby Greany and Peter Earley, eds, School Leadership and Education System Reform

2016 ‘The individual and the social: making education matter for all’, in Sally Greengross, ed, Remaking the welfare state (London, ILC)

2016 ‘The tragedy of the commons and teacher education’, in Jonathan Simons, ed., T he importance of teachers (London: Policy Exchange)

2015 (with Alison Kitson and Susan Steward) Didáctica de la historia en Secundaria Obligatoria y Bachillerato (Madrid, Ediciones Morata)

2015 ‘The skills deficits’, in Anthony Mann and Prue Huddleston, eds, How should our schools respond to the demands of the twenty first century labour market? Eight perspectives, (London, Education and Employers’ Taskforce)

2015 ‘Lessons from London: what can London Challenge tell us about urban school reform’, in D Woods and T Brighouse, eds., The Story of London Challenge (London, London Leadership Strategy)

2013 (with David Woods and Chris Brown) Transforming education for all: the Tower Hamlets story London Borough of Tower Hamlets

2013 (with Christine Gilbert, Becky Francis and Brett Wigdortz) Unleashing greatness: getting the best from an academy system, Pearson/RSA

2012 (with Jo Pearce) What makes great pedagogy? Nine claims from research: a literature review for the National College of School Leadership (NCSL)

2012 Teaching and learning in the twenty-first century: what is an Institute of Education for? Inaugural directorial lecture, Institute of Education (IOE Press)

2012 ‘Teaching and the tail’, in Marshall, P., ed., The tail: radical solutions for transforming education, London, Centre Forum

2012 ‘Using assessment data to support pupil achievement’ in V. Brooks et al., ed Preparing to Teach in Secondary Schools: a student teacher’s guide to professional issues in secondary education (Open University Press, revised third edition)

2012 ‘Models of the curriculum’ in V. Brooks et al., eds, Preparing to Teach in Secondary Schools: a student teacher’s guide to professional issues in secondary education (Open University Press revised third edition)

2011 (with Alison Kitson) Learning History, Teaching History: curriculum, pedagogy and inclusion 11-18 (Milton Keynes, Open University Press)

2003 (with Alison Kitson and Anna Pendry) Understanding History Teaching (Milton Keynes, Open University Press)

2001 (edited, with Denis Gleeson) The Performing School: Managing, Teaching and Learning in a Performance Culture (Routledge/Falmer Press)

2000 What is History Teaching? Language, Ideas and Meaning in Learning about the Past (Open University Press, second edition)

1998 (with Anna Pendry, and contributions from James Arthur and Jon Davison) Professional Learning: History Teachers in the Making (Open University Press)

1996 What Is History Teaching? Language, Ideas and Meaning in Learning about the Past (Open University Press) (reprinted 1997, 1998, 1999, 2000, 2001)

1996 (edited, with David Bridges) Consorting and collaborating in the educational market place: developing new relationships in schools and higher education (Falmer Press)

== Personal life ==
He married Nicola Owen-Jones (1983) and has four daughters.
