= Laura Murphy =

Laura Murphy may refer to:

- Laura Murphy (politician), American politician
- Laura Murphy (academic), professor of human rights in the UK
- Laura Murphy (director), American director of the 2025 film F*** Marry Kill
- Laura Murphy (NYPD Blue), fictional American police officer
- Laura W. Murphy, (born 1955), American lobbyist and civil rights activist
