= Longley Park =

Public park in Sheffield, South Yorkshire, England

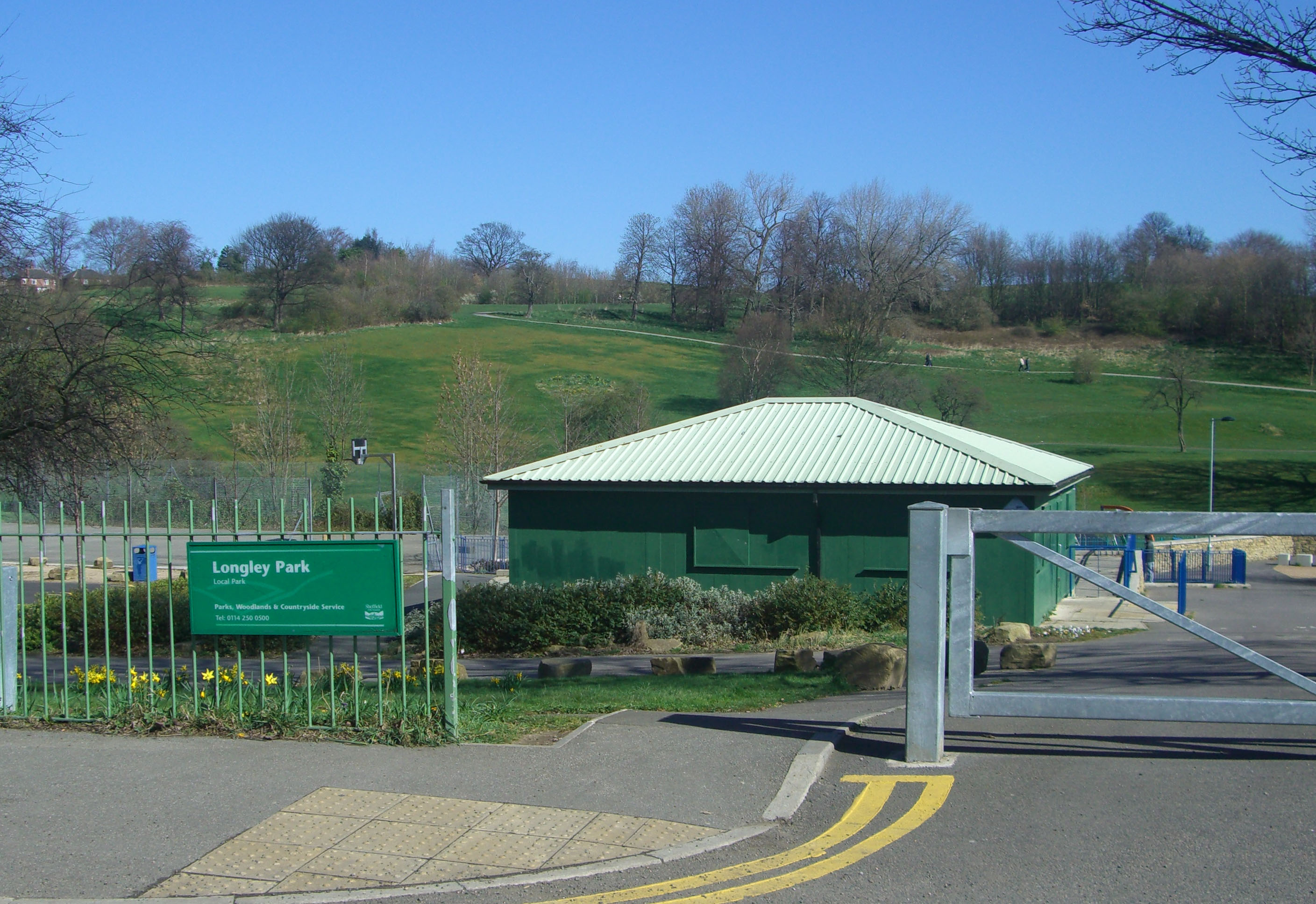
The main entrance on Crowder Road with the pavilion and park behind.

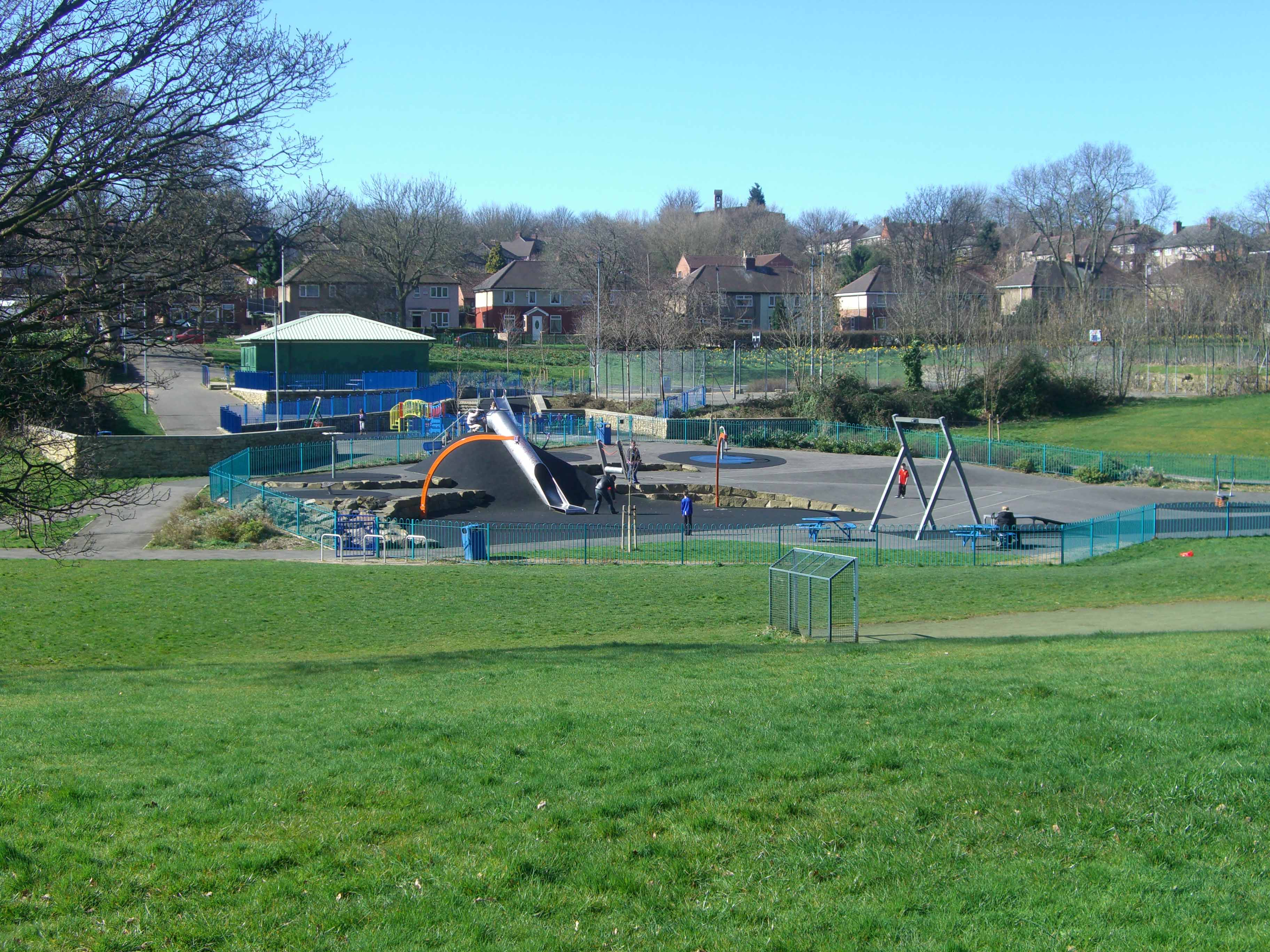
The new children's adventure playground for older children.

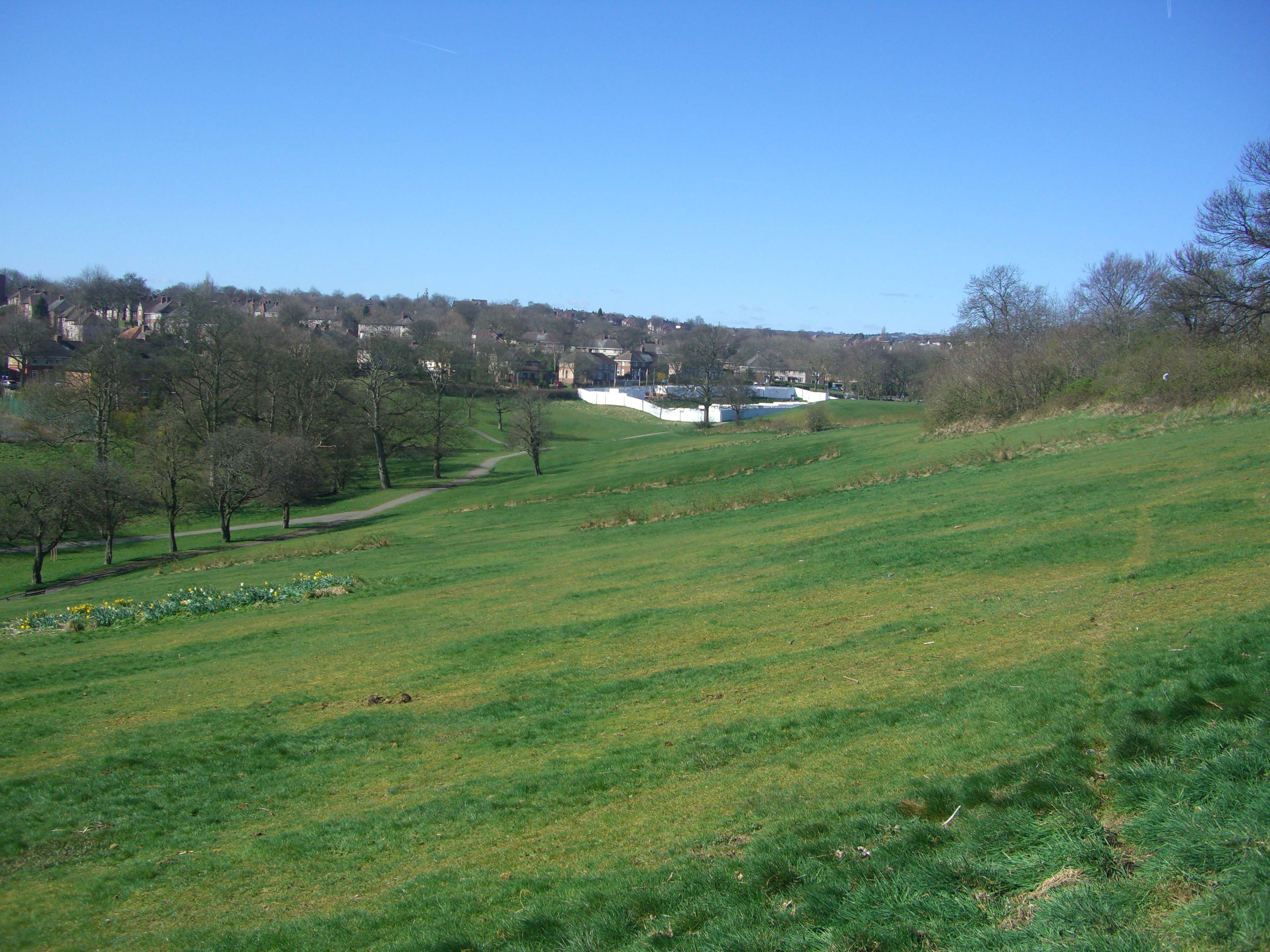
Typical Longley Park landscape, steep slope, valley, trees and shrubs.

Longley Park is a public park within the City of Sheffield, South Yorkshire, England. The park lies between the suburbs of Longley and Firth Park, 2.5 miles (4 km) north of the city centre. It covers an area of just under 52 acres (21 hectares) and is the third largest public park in Sheffield.

== Geography ==
The main entrance to the park lies on Crowder Road at 53.4165°N 1.4627°W although there are several other entrances around the perimeter. It is roughly triangular in shape and is bordered by Elm Lane, Longley Lane, Barnsley Road and Crowder Road. The park has a rolling landscape with hills and valleys, there are numerous copses of old trees. The Bagley Dike rises in a valley in the park and flows on the surface for a short distance before going underground via a man made culvert built in the 1930s to keep the dike away from the old open air swimming pool.

== History ==
Longley Park was officially opened in 1929, it was created by Sheffield City Council to serve the newly built Longley housing estate. The park was established on mostly undeveloped farming land and signs of the hedge boundaries of the ancient field system can still be seen. Crowder House, a large country house which dated back to the 14th century, was the only dwelling on the land which was to become the park and this was demolished to make way for the new estate and park.

The early 1930s saw the park undergo development of its facilities, with a sports pavilion, two football pitches, bowling green, six tennis courts and toilets being built . Much of the labour for this work was provided by the long term unemployed of the Great Depression who had used up their unemployment insurance. On 3 September 1938, a 125-foot (38-metre) by 40-foot (12-metre) outdoor swimming pool was opened in the park along with a 90-foot (27-metre) by 30-foot (9-metre) children's paddling pool. The pools, which were to become the parks major attractions for many years to come, were paid for by local businessman G.H. Lawrence, a razor blade manufacturer. During World War II part of the park was turned into allotments to allow local people to grow their own food. In the 1960s, a nine-hole pitch and putt golf course was constructed in the park along with a putting green.

== Present day ==
In the 1980s the park suffered from vandalism with many of the facilities suffering damage and becoming rundown, the open air swimming pool was closed in 1987 and eventually filled in by the council after being extensively damaged by stolen cars being crashed into it. The golf course closed in the 1980s along with the putting green.

=== Redevelopment ===
The park has been redeveloped in recent years along with the nearby Parson Cross and Colley Parks as part of the Three Parks Programme. New facilities include play areas for toddlers and older children (officially opened by the Lord Mayor in February 2006), and a replanting programme has replaced some of the park's aging trees and shrubs. The park has had new drainage installed to prevent problems with boggy areas, and new footpaths have been laid which are suitable for wheelchairs. The pavilion has been rebuilt and is now run and looked after by the park's bowling club. The tennis courts are no longer used and a car park has been built at the main entrance on Crowder Road on part of the old courts. Another area of the courts has been converted for basketball use. A new seating and picnic area has been constructed near the playgrounds and the whole area around the pavilion has new lighting. Two bowling greens are still in use, and there is one full size football pitch and two five-a-side football pitches.
