= Sheffield Hallam University =

Public university in South Yorkshire, England

- Coat of arms
- Former names: Sheffield Polytechnic; Sheffield City Polytechnic
- Motto: Learn and Serve
- Type: Public
- Established: 1843; 183 years ago – founded 1992; 34 years ago – university status
- Affiliations: Association of Commonwealth Universities; EUA
- Endowment: £0.19 million (2022)
- Budget: £311.2 million (2021–22)
- Chancellor: Vacant
- Vice-Chancellor: Liz Mossop
- Faculty: 2,114
- Students: 30,765 (2024/25)
- Undergraduates: 21,990 (2024/25)
- Postgraduates: 8,775 (2024/25)
- Location: Sheffield, South Yorkshire, England; 53.3791°N 1.4647°W
- Campus: City Campus and Collegiate Crescent Campus
- Public transit (City Campus only): B P Sheffield Station / Sheffield Hallam University
- Colours: Maroon, Grey, Black and White
- Website: www.shu.ac.uk

Sheffield Hallam University (SHU) is a public research university in Sheffield, South Yorkshire, England. The university is based on two sites; the City Campus is located in the city centre near Sheffield railway station, while the Collegiate Crescent Campus is about two miles away in the Broomhall Estate off Ecclesall Road in south-west Sheffield. A third campus at Brent Cross Town in the London Borough of Barnet is expected to open for the 2025–2026 academic year.

The university is the 14th largest university in the UK (out of 169) with 30,765 students (of whom 4,400 are international students), 4,494 staff and 708 courses.

== History ==
=== Foundation and growth ===
In 1843, as the industrial revolution gathered pace and Sheffield was on the verge of becoming the steel, tool and cutlery making capital of the world, the Sheffield School of Design was founded following lobbying by artist Benjamin Haydon. The day-to-day running was controlled by the local council, whilst the Board of Trade in London appointed the head. Tuition began in a 60x40ft rented room off Glossop Road. In 1850, the School of Design was renamed Sheffield School of Art.

In 1905, the City of Sheffield Training College (later renamed Sheffield City College of Education) on Collegiate Crescent admitted its first 90 students. During the First World War, the Collegiate Hall was requisitioned by the War Office to create the 3rd Northern General Hospital, a facility for the Royal Army Medical Corps to treat military casualties.

A new city centre campus was constructed during the 1960s. During construction, in February 1962, a tower crane on site collapsed during the Great Sheffield Gale. It crashed into the side of what would become the Owen Building, causing serious damage and setting back construction. In 1967, the Owen Building was completed. Built in a functional 1960s design, it has since been modernised and comprehensively renovated with an atrium linking it to four adjacent buildings. In 1969 the Sheffield School of Design merged with the city's College of Technology to form Sheffield Polytechnic. In 1976, Sheffield Polytechnic merged with the city's two teacher training colleges (Sheffield City College and Totley Hall College) and was renamed Sheffield City Polytechnic. From 1979 to 1988 students from Sheffield City Polytechnic were based at Wentworth Woodhouse, near Rotherham. Two departments, Physical Education and Geography and Environmental Studies, were based on site. In 1987 Sheffield City Polytechnic became a founding member of the Northern Consortium.

=== University status to present day ===
In 1992, Sheffield City Polytechnic became Sheffield Hallam University (SHU), with the right to award its own degrees.

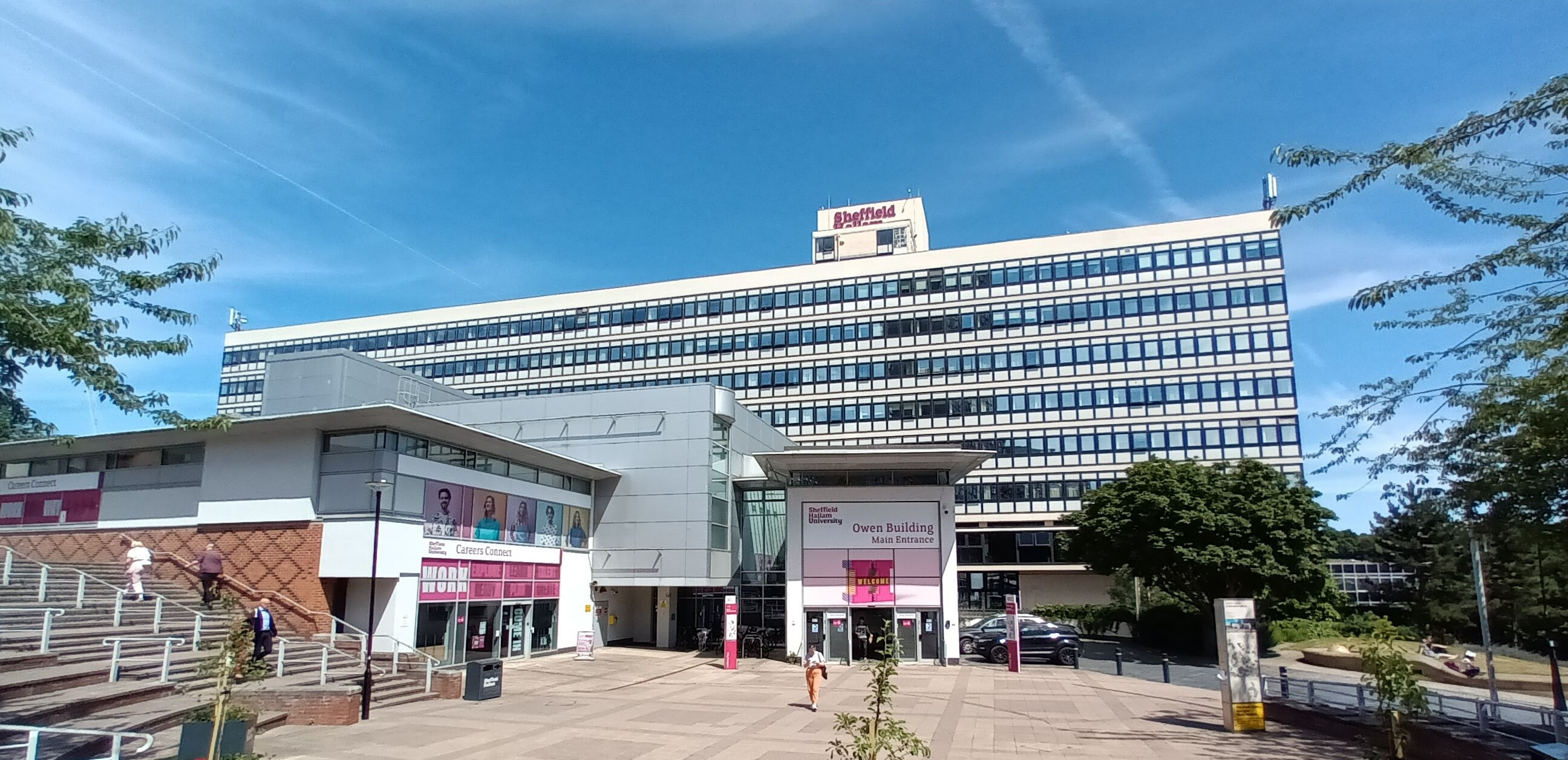
Sheffield Hallam University

In 2005, SHU was reorganised into four faculties. The new Faculty of Development and Society, with an emphasis on 'people, places and spaces', brought together education, geography, humanities, law, and social sciences. At the same time, with the intention of further developing research and teaching in the new Faculty of Health and Wellbeing, a new Clinical Academic Group was launched. The building that had been designed and constructed to house the National Centre for Popular Music became the university's students' union building (the HUBS). The Nelson Mandela Building, the former students' union building (when opened in 1978 was known as the Phoenix building), was sold and has since been demolished.

In 2007, SHU took over the teaching of nursing and midwifery from the University of Sheffield. These activities are now based at the Collegiate Crescent Campus. The following year the Psalter Lane campus (formerly the Sheffield College of Art) was closed, and the activities transferred to the City Campus. The £26 million energy-efficient Furnival Building opened in September (renamed Cantor Building in 2011 in recognition of a major donor to the university). The building, which includes teaching spaces and an art gallery has been described as "the impressive new entry point to the campus". For the 2025–26 academic year, the university expects to open its London campus at the Brent Cross Town development in the London Borough of Barnet. The campus will accommodate up to 5,000 students by 2030.

== Organisation and governance ==
=== Colleges ===
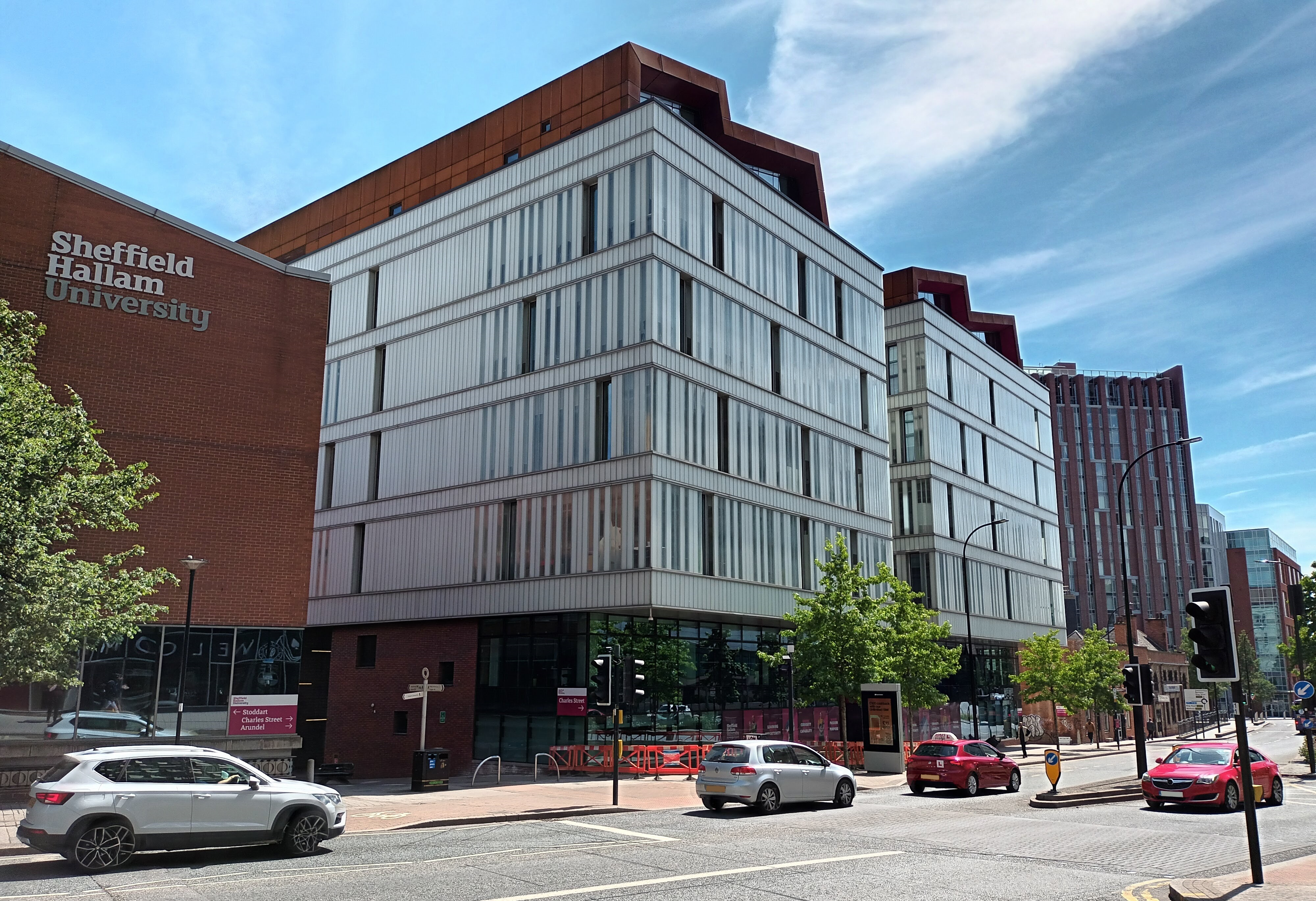
Charles Street building

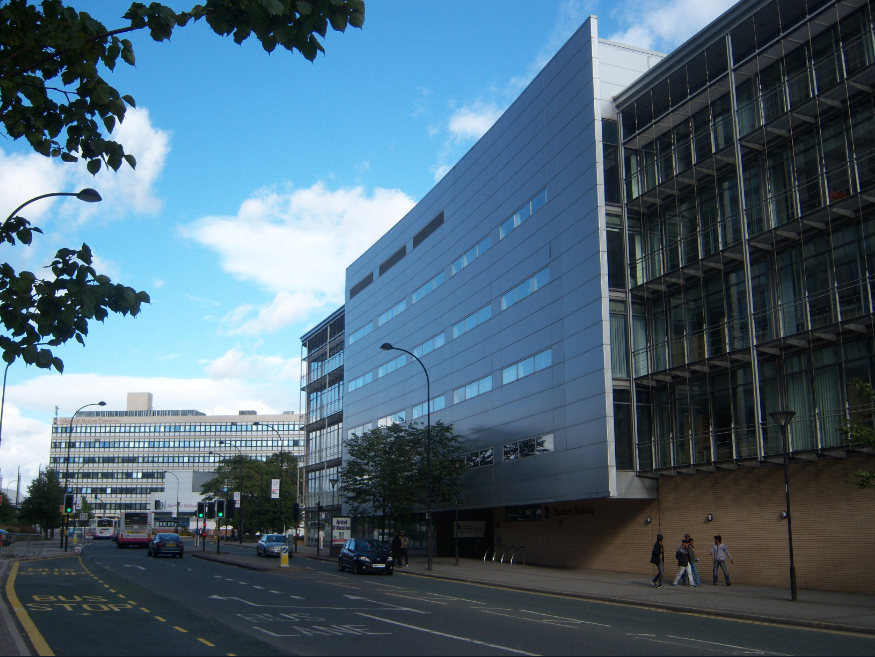
SHU's Owen Building (left) and Stoddart Building (right), part of the City Campus on Arundel Gate

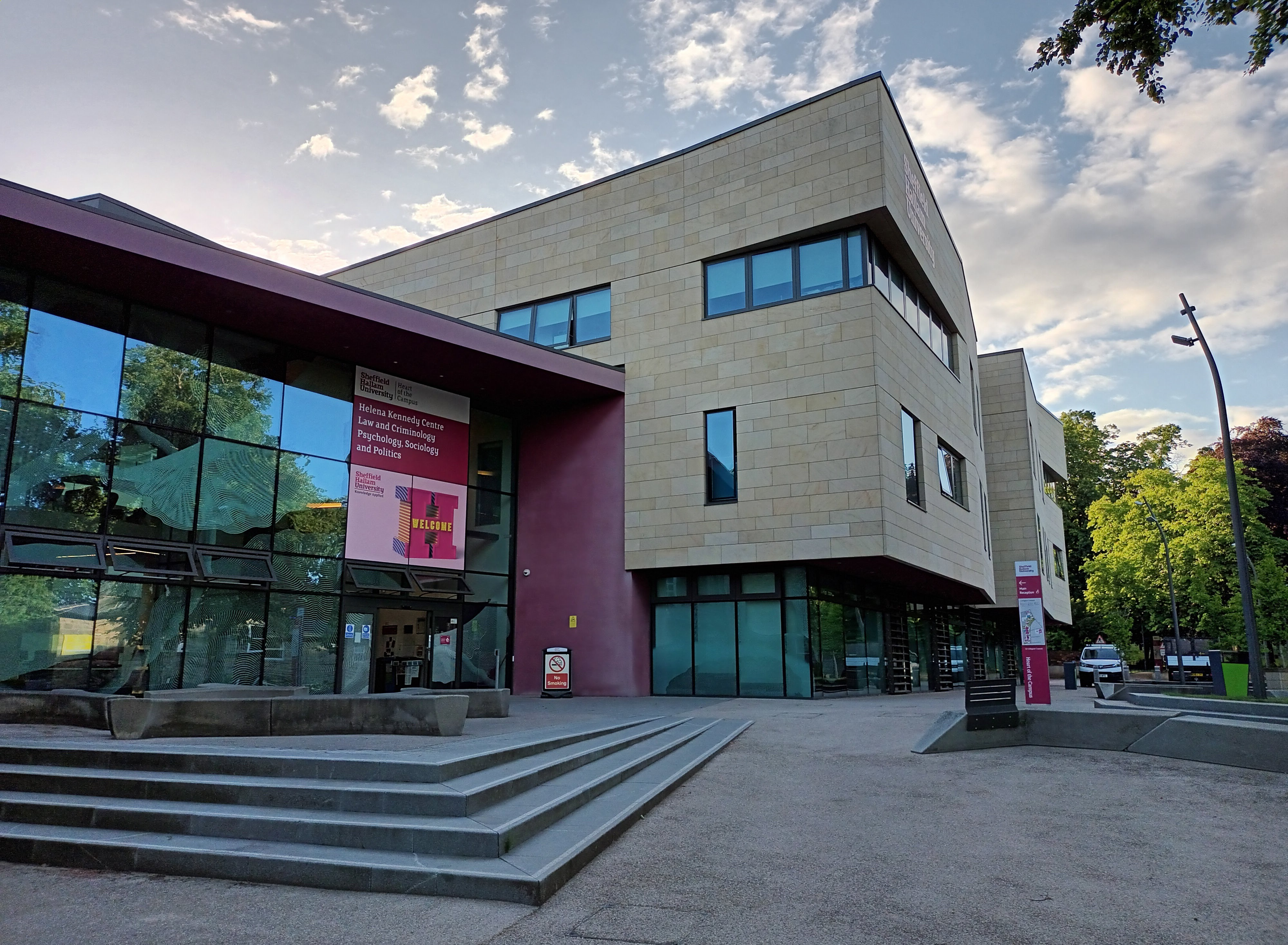
Collegiate Campus, Sheffield Hallam University

In 2020, the university relaunched its structure moving away from four faculties and re-organising academic departments into colleges.

College of Business, Technology and Engineering (BTE)

- Sheffield Business School
- School of Computing and Digital Technologies
- School of Engineering and Built Environment

College of Social Sciences and Arts (SSA)

- Sheffield Creative Industries Institute
- Sheffield Institute of Law and Social Sciences
- Sheffield Institute of Education

College of Health, Wellbeing and Life Sciences (HWLS)

- School of Biosciences and Chemistry
- School of Health and Social Care
- School of Sport and Physical Activity

=== Research ===
==== Research centres ====
- Advanced Wellbeing Research Centre (AWRC)
- Biomolecular Sciences Research Centre (BMRC)
- Centre for Behavioural Science and Applied Psychology (CeBSAP)
- Centre for Development and Research in Education (CDARE)
- Centre for Regional Economic and Social Research (CRESR)
- Centre for Sport and Exercise Science (CSES)
- Centre for Sports Engineering Research (CSER)
- Design Futures Centre for Industrial Collaboration (Design Futures)
- Humanities Research Centre (HRC)
- Lab4Living
- National Centre of Excellence for Food Engineering (NCEFE)
- Sport Industry Research Centre (SIRC)
- Sport and Physical Activity Research Centre (SPARC)

==== Research institutes ====
- Cultural, Communication and Computing Research Institute (C3RI)
  - Art, Design and Media Research Centre (ADRC)
  - Communication and Computing Research Centre (CCRC)
- Materials and Engineering Research Institute (MERI)
  - Centre for Automation and Robotics Research (CARR)
  - National HIPIMS Technology Centre
  - Polymers, Nanocomposites and Modelling Research Centre
  - Structural Materials and Integrity Research Centre
  - Thin Films Research Centre
- Sheffield Business School Research Institute (SBSRI)
- Sheffield Institute for Policy Studies (SIPS)
- Sheffield Institute of Education (SIoE)

==== Groups and networks ====
- Voluntary Action Research Group
- Film, Television, Theatre and Performance Research Network
- Health and Social Care Research
- Law Research Group
- Natural and Built Environment Research Group
- Outdoor Recreation Research Group
- Physical Activity, Wellness and Public Health Research Group (PAWPH)
- Sheffield Addiction Research Recovery Group
- Sport and Human Performance Research Group
- Sports Engineering Research Group
- Sports Industry Research Group

Through the research centres a number of spin-off companies have been formed, including:

- Sheaf Solutions – automotive and aerospace organisation
- Hallam Biotech – biotech analysis and synthesis
- Materials Analysis & Research Services (MARS) – materials analysis and solutions
- Bodycote – materials coating
- Design Futures – product design, packaging design, research & strategy

=== Chancellors ===
The position is currently vacant following the death of Uriah Rennie on 8 June 2025, who had been installed as Chancellor in a ceremony at the university on Thursday 8 May 2025.

- Bryan Nicholson 1992–2001
- Robert Winston, 2001–2018
- Helena Kennedy, 2018–2025
- Uriah Rennie May–June 2025

== Academic profile ==
Rankings
National rankings
- Complete (2027): 81=
- Guardian (2027): 88
- Times / Sunday Times (2027): 95

Global rankings
- QS (2027): 1001–1200
- THE (2026): 801–1000

=== Lifelong Learning Network ===
SHU is the lead partner for Higher Futures, the Lifelong Learning Network (LLN) for South Yorkshire, North Derbyshire and North Nottinghamshire.

=== Rankings and reputational issues ===
In the National Student Survey, several subject areas at SHU have performed very well in terms of overall student satisfaction with their courses: for example, architecture and geography have both been placed first, and planning has been placed second.

In the university league tables, Sheffield Hallam University was placed 47th out of 121 UK universities by The Guardian University Guide 2021; 65th out of 131 by The Times & Sunday Times Good University Guide 2020; and 67th out of 130 by the Complete University Guide 2021. In 2019, it ranked 485th among the universities around the world by SCImago Institutions Rankings.

Hallam received a First Class award and was ranked 15th out of 151 universities in the People & Planet University League 2015 which assesses universities on their environmental credentials. In 2020, the university was awarded The Times and Sunday Times University of the Year award for teaching quality.

In 2022, the university's vice-chancellor taken some pride in Laura Murphy's research into Uyghur forced labour in China, even though this might reduce the number of Chinese students at the university. In 2025, the university apologised to Murphy, after she had been told that she could not continue her research into human rights abuses in China. The instruction for Laura Murphy to halt her research came six months after the Sheffield Hallam university decided to abandon the planned report on the risk of Uyghur forced labour in the critical minerals supply chain, and return the funding associated with that research to the original grantor, Global Rights Compliance. UK counter-terrorism police subsequently commenced an investigation into the matter. In November 2025, it was announced that the foreign affairs select committee's inquiry into review of UK-China relations was to be broadened after Sheffield Hallam University disclosures.

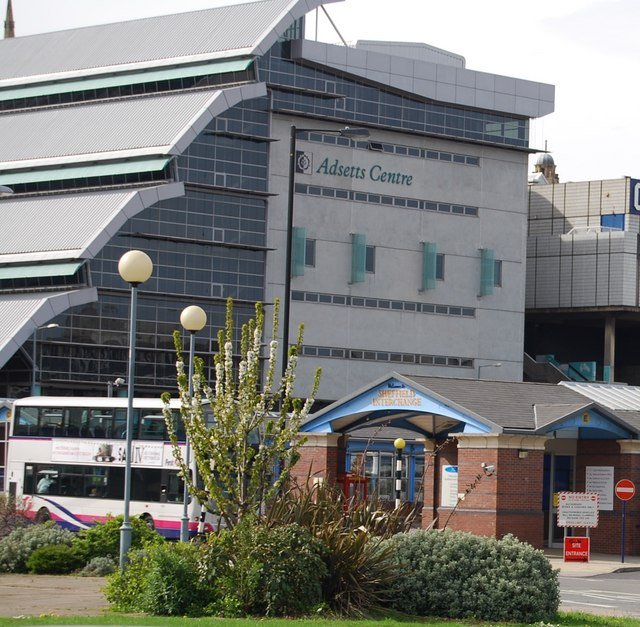
Adsetts Learning Centre

== Notable alumni ==
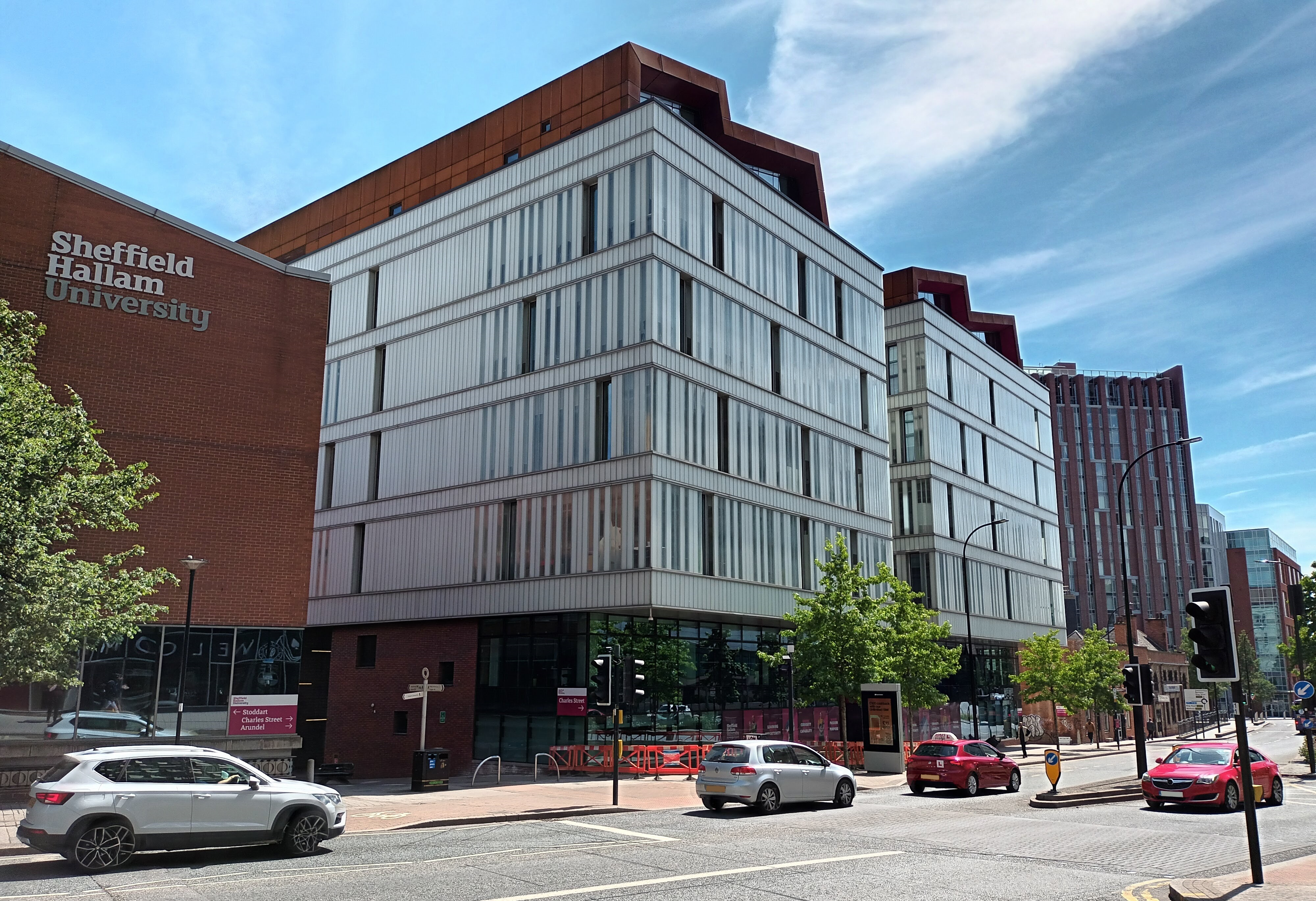
Sheffield Hallam University buildings

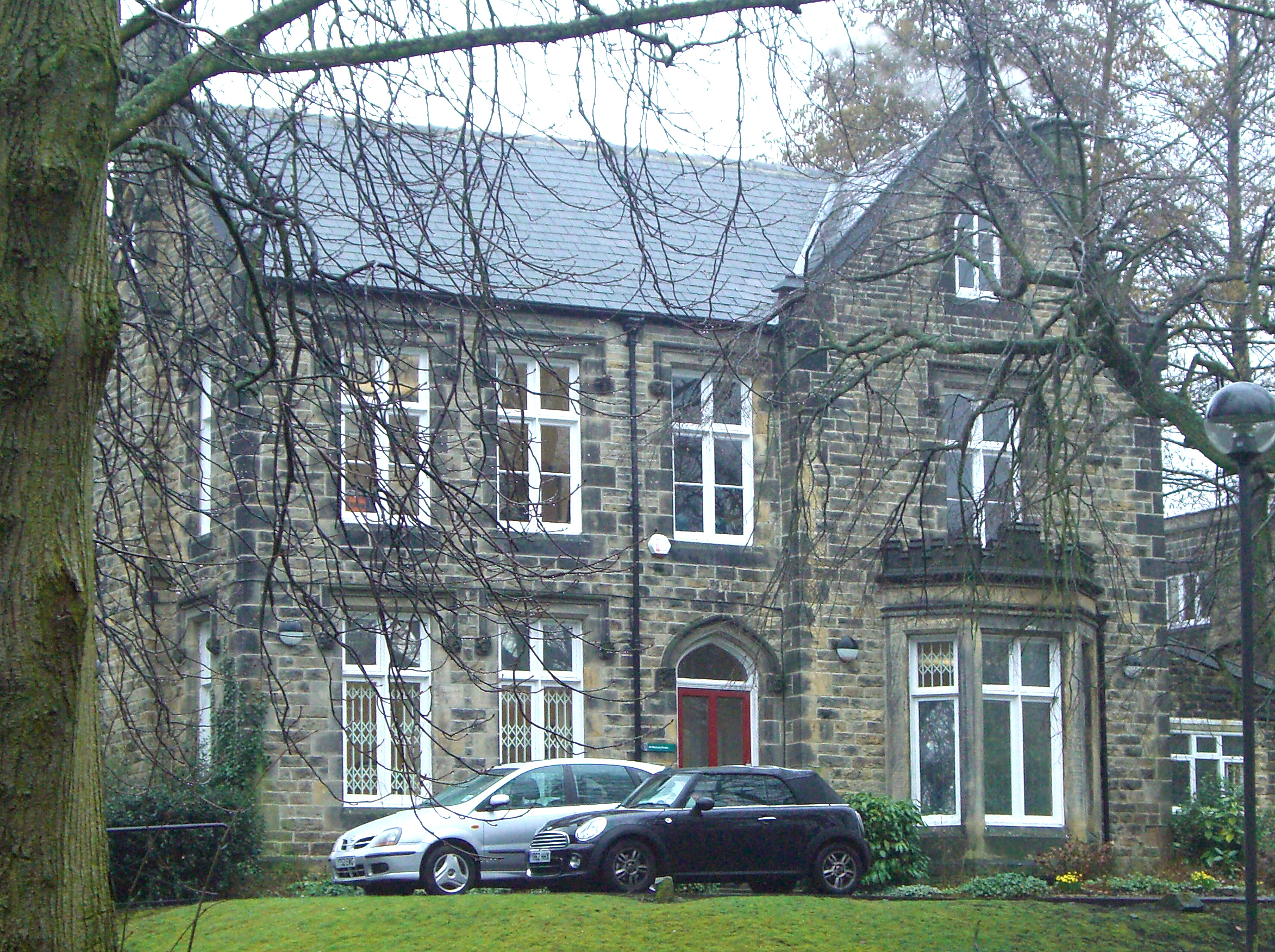
Collegiate Crescent campus

- Nazir Ahmed, Labour Party peer
- Kid Acne, artist and musician
- Andy Akinwolere, TV presenter on Blue Peter
- Emily Asquith, boxer
- Roma Babuniak, artist
- Graham Barnfield, pundit and happy slapping analyst
- Lee Blackett, Leeds Tykes rugby union player
- Peter Booth, Australian modern bleak landscape painter
- Samuel Brooksworth, businessman
- Josephine Bunch, British physicist
- Richard Caborn, former Labour MP for Sheffield Central, and former minister of sport
- Andy Carthy, AKA Mr. Scruff, British DJ and artist
- Joanna Constantinidis, ceramist
- Eric Dancer, Lord Lieutenant of Devon
- Kate Dover, 1870s student of Sheffield School of Art, and arsenic poisoner
- Richard O'Dwyer, TV Shack creator
- Natalie Finnemore, installation artist
- Dave Godin, Tamla Motown enthusiast, cinema proprietor and political activist
- Graham Gristwood and Emily Benham, World Champions in Orienteering.
- Steven Hall, award-winning novelist
- Mark Herbert, (Film Studies 1991–94) film producer, and head of Sheffield-based Warp Films
- Stephanie Hill, classical-crossover singer and Miss England 2017
- Andrea Hirata, Indonesian Writer of "The Rainbow Troops"
- Dame Kelly Holmes, double Olympic medallist 2004
- Chris Jones, Sale and England international rugby player
- Ben Jones-Bishop, Leeds Rhinos rugby league player
- Sean Lamont, Northampton and Scotland international rugby union player
- Runyararo Mapfumo, director.
- Tom Meeten, comedian and actor
- David Mellor, international designer and cutlery-maker
- Martin Narey, CEO of Barnardo's, and former director general of the Prison Service
- Kim Noble and Stuart Silver, (Noble and Silver), comedians, winners of 2000 Perrier Award for best newcomer
- Bruce Oldfield, fashion designer
- Oluwatobi Oyero, bassist and band leader
- Nick Park, animator, creator of Wallace & Gromit and Oscar winner
- Byron Roberts, musician and author
- Stanley Royle, 20th-century landscape artist
- Steve Peat, World Championship winning downhill mountain biker
- Kenneth Steel, artist and engraver
- David Strettle, Harlequins and England international rugby player
- Joakim Sundström, sound designer
- Leon Taylor, Olympic diver (silver medal)
- Andy Whitfield, actor best known for his role in TV drama Spartacus.
- Howard Wilkinson, Football Association technical director, former Leeds United and Sheffield Wednesday manager
- Reuben Wu, artist and musician
- Astrid Zydower, sculptor

== Notable staff ==
- Alison Adam, professor of science, technology and society.
- Geoff Cartwright, senior lecturer in Environmental Conservation 1995–2012: joint winner of the 2011 Individual award in the Environment Awards of the Sheffield Telegraph for his work on the development of a nature reserve at Blackburn Meadows on the site of the former Tinsley sewage farm.
- I. M. Dharmadasa, applied physicist and researcher of low cost solar cells
- Hywel Jones, materials scientist and inventor in advanced ceramics and metals, Principal Research Fellow
- Marina Lewycka (1946–2025), senior lecturer in Media Studies 1998–2012, author of several novels including A Short History of Tractors in Ukrainian (2005)
- Laura Murphy, Professor of Human Rights
- Frederick Brian Pickering (1927–2017), metallurgist
- Jane Rogers, winner of the 2012 Arthur C. Clarke Award for the 'best science fiction novel of the year' for The Testament of Jessie Lamb
- Jawed Siddiqi, Professor of Software Engineering and political activist
- Frances Spalding, art historian, former lecturer

== See also ==
- Armorial of British universities
- Hallam F.C.
- List of universities in the United Kingdom
- National Centre for Popular Music
- Post-1992 university
- Psalter Lane Campus
- UTC Sheffield City Centre and UTC Sheffield Olympic Legacy Park
- University of Sheffield
