= Laura Murphy (academic) =

American academic

- Education: Louisiana State University (BA) Syracuse University (MA) Harvard University (MA, PhD)
- Occupation: Academic
- Employer(s): Loyola University, Sheffield Hallam University
- Known for: Modern slavery research

Laura T. Murphy is a professor of Human Rights at Sheffield Hallam University. Her work focuses on modern slavery. Murphy became prominent in 2025 when Sheffield Hallam apologised to her for removing their support for her work on forced labour in China.

== Life ==
Murphy grew up in Louisiana, where she says it was impossible to keep the evidence of slavery secret. There were fancy mansions that the plantation owners owned. That privileged life ended after the US Civil War, but Murphy makes the point that life improved for many people as a result.

Murphy worked in the English department of Loyola University in New Orleans, where she was an associate professor of English and led the university's Modern Slavery Research Project. She published her first book Metaphor and the Slave Trade in West African Literature, which was awarded the 2014 African Literature Association First Book Prize. In 2016, she was a co-author of a study to estimate the number of trafficked people in Greater New Orleans.

She became a professor of Human Rights at Sheffield Hallam University's Helena Kennedy Centre for International Justice. She investigates human trafficking and modern slavery in several countries. Her 2021 book Freedomville exposed a deeper story behind a group of modern slaves who overthrew their masters in India. The revolt had not been non-violent, and the narrative was more complex than generally understood.

She has spent time looking at forced labour in China. In 2022 she published "Financing and Genocide: Development Finance and the Crisis in the Uyghur Region" which established links between what some call "a genocide" and funding from the World Bank's International Finance Corporation. In that year, Sheffield Hallam University's vice-chancellor, Sir Chris Husbands, wrote about his pride in her research, while acknowledging that this might reduce the number of Chinese students at their university.

She was employed by the US Department of Homeland Security to assist them in implementing the Uyghur Forced Labor Prevention Act during the presidency of Joe Biden.

In 2023, she was named Champion of the Year by the Human Trafficking Legal Center. The human tracking center was started by Martina Vandenberg in America, and although they gave Murphy the award, Murphy pointed out that it was her research team that had created important reports. Most of her team, she said, were Uyghurs. Her university boasted that her team's work had prevented $1.8 billion of Chinese goods from being exported to America.

After returning from a career break in 2025, Sheffield Hallam informed Murphy that she could not continue her research into human rights abuses in China, following pressure from the Chinese Government. Moreover, the university decided not to publish her research despite being legally obliged to do so with the bodies that funded her research. They returned funds from the Global Rights Compliance (GRC) to avoid publishing her research about "Uyghur forced labour in the critical minerals supply chain". The Global Rights Compliance published her work itself.

Murphy appealed Sheffield Hallam's decision and demanded copies of the correspondence. The university went back on their decision and said that they had decided to back her research. Her university apologised to her. Murphy noted that UK universities were underfunded; however, there were only a small percentage of Chinese students at her university, but it was a consideration. The university had been concerned by pressure applied to their employees in Beijing and difficulty with getting insurance. The Minister of Education, David Lammy, offered his support and noted that academic freedom should be assured. UK counter-terrorism police subsequently commenced an investigation into the matter.

In November, the police said that her case had been referred to counter-intelligence. They were considering whether anyone had "assist[ed] a foreign intelligence service". This would contravene the UK's 2023 National Security Act. The Guardian reported that Laura Murphy's treatment was exceptional but it was not unique. Other academics said that they were unwilling to speak out. Andreas Fulda, a University of Nottingham academic said that he had received attention that he believed was intended to get him to change his opinions. Jo Smith Finley, an academic in Chinese Studies at Newcastle University, had been targeted in 2021 by Chinese disapproval and said that her university thought of their student fees when they considered her case. Murphy who was a Carr-Ryan Fellow published her own defence.

== Publications include ==
- Metaphor and the Slave Trade in West African Literature
- Survivors of Slavery: Modern-Day Slave Narratives
- The New Slave Narrative: The Battle Over Representations of Contemporary Slavery, 2019
- Freedomville: The Story of a 21st Century Slave Revolt, 2021
- Financing and Genocide: Development Finance and the Crisis in the Uyghur Region
- Health workers are in a unique position to help identify human trafficking, 2023, (co-author)

== See also ==
- Chinese censorship abroad
- China–United Kingdom relations
- Xinjiang Production and Construction Corps
