= Higher Futures =

Higher Futures, established in 2006, is the Lifelong Learning Network (LLN) for South Yorkshire, North Derbyshire and North Nottinghamshire. It is one of many LLNs operating in each region across the country.

Higher Futures aims to help vocational and work-based learners in five priority sectors - early years education, engineering, health and social care, public wellbeing, and sustainable communities - to progress from further education to higher education.

Higher Futures' partner institutions are:

- Sheffield Hallam University (lead partner)
- University of Sheffield
- Barnsley College
- Chesterfield College
- Dearne Valley College
- Doncaster College
- Longley Park Sixth Form
- North Nottinghamshire College
- Northern College
- Rotherham College of Arts and Technology
- The Sheffield College
- Thomas Rotherham College

Aims and objectives Through effective collaboration, Higher Futures aims to:

- Enhance the supply of higher education provision and transform institutional cultures, processes and procedures;
- Improve progression opportunities to higher education through vocational routes;
- Increase demand from employers and vocational learners for higher level skills and education;
- Improve access to information, advice and guidance (IAG) and transition support.

== See also ==
- Lifelong Learning Networks (LLNs)
