= Longley, Sheffield =

Suburb of Sheffield, England

Coordinates: 53.4172°N 1.4706°W

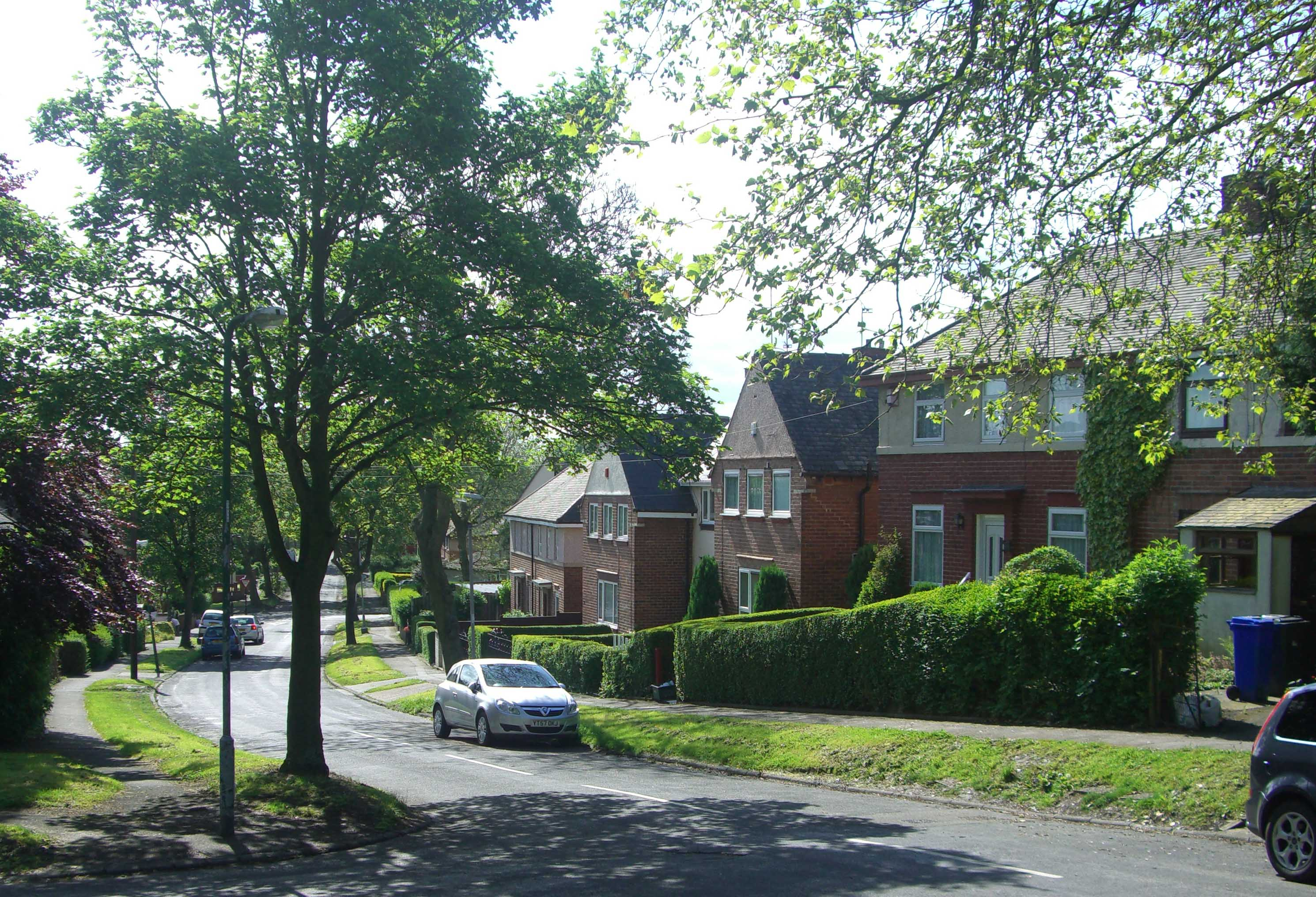
Typical Longley estate housing on Piper Road.

Longley is a suburb of the City of Sheffield, in South Yorkshire, England. It lies about 2.5 miles (4.0 km) north of the city centre and is a residential neighbourhood made up mostly of housing built by Sheffield City Council in the late 1920s. The suburb falls within the Firth Park ward of the City.

== History ==
The recorded history of the Longley area goes back to the Late Middle Ages with the first mention being in 1366 when it was part of the parish of Ecclesfield. At that time it was a hamlet called "Longeley", meaning "ong Clearing", subsequent spellings over the years were “Longlegh” and “Longlee”. From the start of the 15th century the sparse population of Longley rented their land from the Earl of Shrewsbury who was Lord of the manor. During this time the inhabitants were mostly employed in arable and livestock farming although there was also some small scale cutlery manufacturing.

In 1617 Longley came under the ownership of Thomas Howard, 21st Earl of Arundel, a member of the family who later became the Dukes of Norfolk. With the onset of the Industrial Revolution the agricultural nature of Longley became threatened as the farms found it harder to be profitable and the expanding industry of Sheffield came ever closer. In the early part of the 20th century Longley became within the boundary of the City of Sheffield and was earmarked as a site for a council housing estate and the rural life disappeared altogether.

== Significant historic buildings ==
The Longley area had a number of large country houses before it became part of Sheffield, most of these have now been demolished.

Longley shown within Sheffield

=== Longley Hall ===
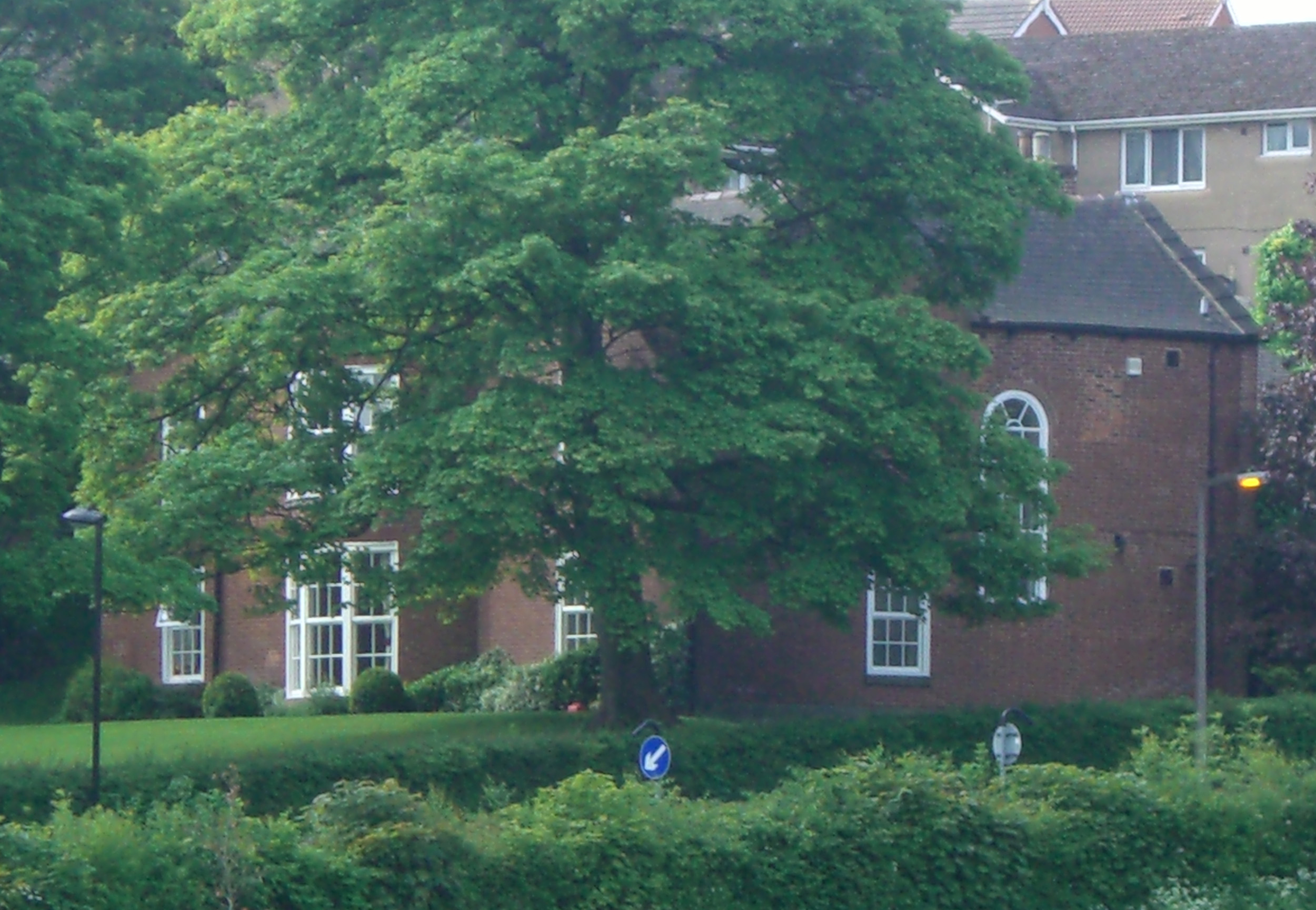
Longley Hall is well screened from the road.

Longley Hall stands on Longley Lane at its junction with Crowder Road, it was built around 1780 for Kenyon Parker a renowned and wealthy Sheffield law attorney. It is a Grade II listed building which became the target of vandals throughout the 1970s. In 1980 the hall was purchased by Business Advisory Services Ltd., who restored the building to a high standard inside and out. Today the Hall is owned by a private landlord, and operated as a Supported living project providing a home for people with a range of disabilities. It is surrounded by modern housing and well screened and is easily missed by the passer-by although there is a plaque on the wall on Longley Lane.

Longley Hall Farm was adjacent to the Hall on what is now Crowder Road. Between 1906 and the 1950s the farm produced fresh milk, meat and vegetables for the nearby Northern General Hospital. The farm was demolished in 1969 and its land was used for housing.

=== Crowder House ===
Crowder House was situated on what is now Crowland Road, it had extensive grounds, some of which were incorporated into Longley Park. It is the oldest of Longley’s country houses with a history going back to at least 1402 when it was mentioned in the transfer of deeds. The house was the property of the Wilkinson family for over 300 years until May 1855 when the family were ejected, after a lessee went bankrupt. The family still had connections with the house until 1859 when Bernard Wake, a solicitor, purchased it. The house was demolished in 1935 being replaced by the new housing on Crowland Road.

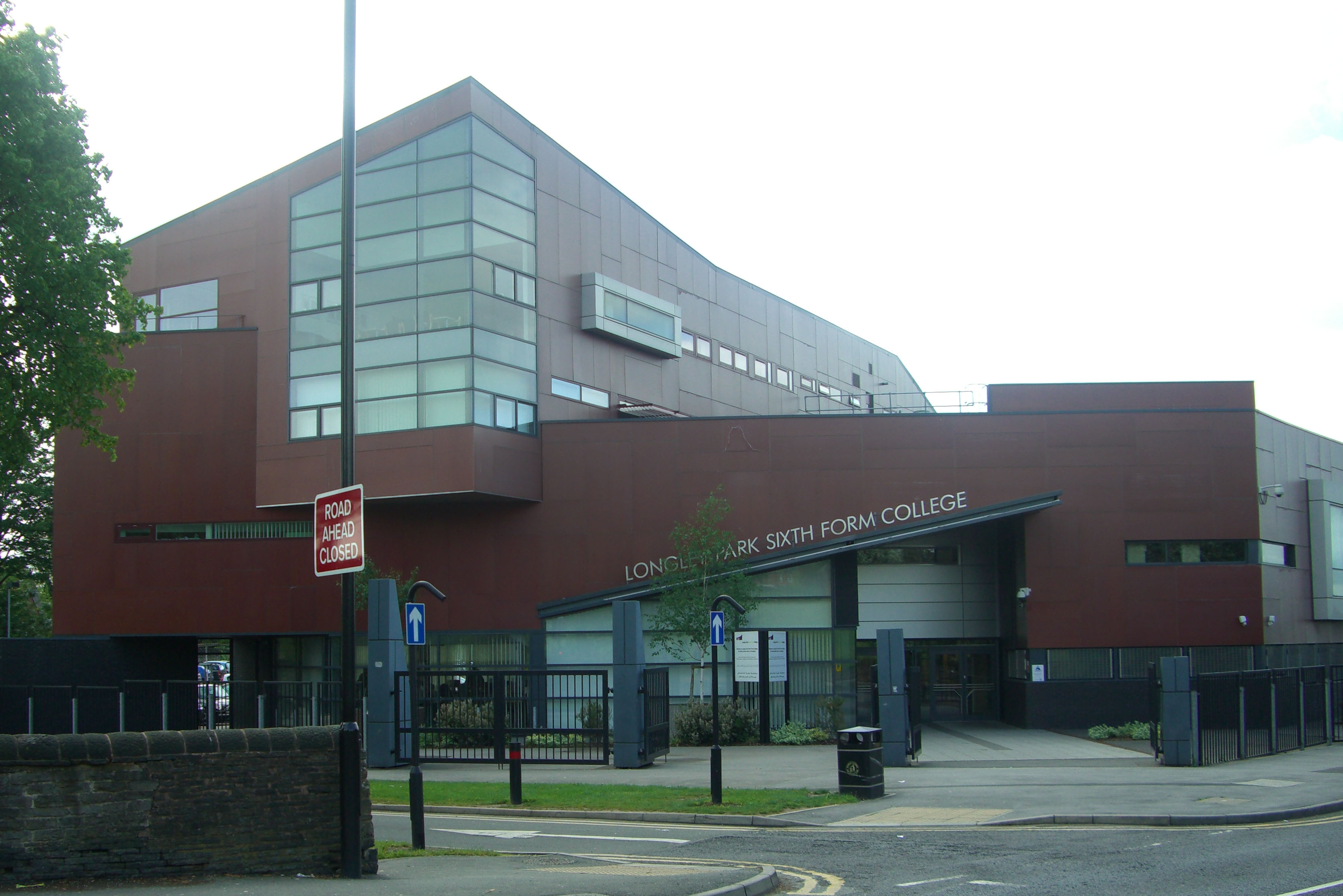
Longley Park Sixth Form now stands on the site of The Brushes.

=== The Brushes ===
The Brushes was located at the junction of Longley Lane and Barnsley Road. It was built in 1790, however Brushes Farm existed on the site in the 1640s, at the time of the English Civil War when its first resident Captain Burley was executed in 1646 for siding with the Royalists. The Booth family bought the farm in 1708 and John Booth who had made his wealth through iron and steel production built The Brushes mansion next to the farm in 1790. Charles Kayser became the owner in 1888 and he demolished the farm and built a castellated tower to complement the mansion. In 1920 the building became Firth Park Grammar School after being purchased by Sheffield Corporation for £22,000. The building was demolished in 2002-03 and Longley Park Sixth Form now stands in its place.

=== Norwood Grange ===
Norwood Grange stands at the junction of Herries Road and Longley Lane. It is a gabled house built in the 1850s for Thomas Fisher, a partner in the Britannia metal company of Shaw and Fisher. After a succession of owners the Grange was purchased by Sheffield Council just before World War II. During the conflict it was used by the Auxiliary Fire Service and Air Raid Wardens as a base. The house fell into a dilapidated state in the post war years. In the early 1990s the main house was restored and extended and turned into Norwood Grange Residential Home. Some of the outbuildings are still in a run down state.

=== Cliffe House ===
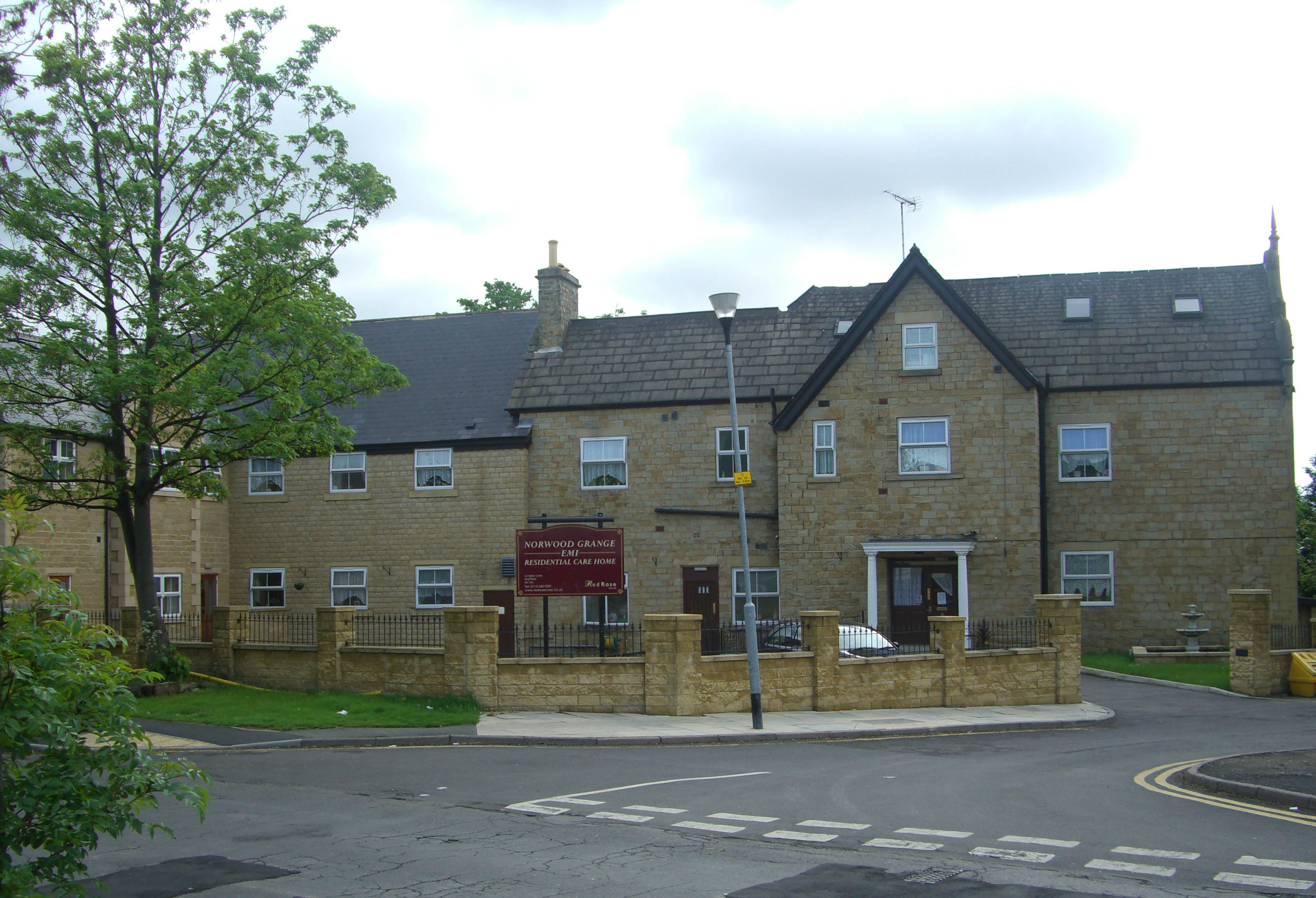
Norwood Grange has been renovated and is now a residential care home.

Cliffe House stood on Elm Lane at the site which is now Elm Lane Fire Station. The house was built in 1805 by Sarah Booth of The Brushes. In 1934 it became The Cliffe Institute for Mental Defectives. In 1938 the Fire Station was built on the extensive grounds while the house remained standing and was used as quarters for the firemen. The house was demolished immediately after World War II and the land was used for housing, with the houses on Hereward Road being built on the site.

== Modern times ==
In the early part of the 1920s Sheffield City Council started buying up land in the area from local land-owners. On 10 June 1926 the Council’s plans for 2,000 new houses at Longley were endorsed and tenants started moving into the completed dwellings in 1927. A school was built for the new estate on Raisen Hall Road with the official opening ceremony taking place on 17 July 1930, it accommodated over 400 children when first opened. Longley Park was officially opened in 1929 to serve as a recreation area for the new estate.

Present day Longley has a population of 6,190 living in 2,642 households. 53.3% of Longley’s houses are rented from the local authority, well above Sheffield’s average of 26.5%. One of the newest housing developments in Longley has been the building of 20 bungalows for the elderly on Everingham Place by the South Yorkshire Housing Association. The development which has two of the bungalows specifically designed for the disabled opened in December 2003.

The National Blood Service has its regional headquarters in Longley, the centre on Longley Lane processes, tests and stores blood donations from the South Yorkshire area. The Longley area does not have any public houses strictly within its boundaries, the nearest one being the Devonshire Arms on Herries Road, which is in the adjacent district of Shirecliffe. The area had its own ecclesial parish created in 1929 called St Leonards, Norwood. The foundation stone for a new church on Everingham Road was laid in July 1939, however because of World War II it was not completed and consecrated until May 1950.
