= Martina Vandenberg =

American lawyer

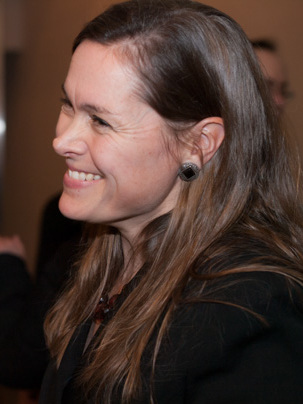
Vandenberg in 2014

Martina E. Vandenberg (born c. 1968) is an American lawyer, activist, and nonprofit executive. She is the founder and president of the Human Trafficking Legal Center, a nonprofit that trains pro bono lawyers to seek restitution for human trafficking victims.

== Early life and education ==
Vandenberg grew up in Gilroy, California. She attended Pomona College, where she studied international relations and was president of the student body. Vandenberg's presidency at Pomona was marked by controversy, as her electoral campaign had promised willingness to support the college's fraternity system, but upon election she became a strong proponent of the destruction of that system, leading to accusations that she was elected under false pretenses as an "undercover activist". While disillusionment with her presidency was widespread, Pomona's student government charter at the time lacked a mechanism for her recall. After graduating in 1990, she earned a master's degree in Russian/East European studies from Oxford University as a Rhodes Scholar. In 1992, at the age of 24, she moved to Russia and founded the country's first rape crisis center. She became a Truman Scholar in 1998, and earned a J.D. from Columbia Law School.

== Career ==
Vandenberg was a researcher for Human Rights Watch, for which she authored two reports, "Hopes Betrayed: Trafficking of Women and Girls to Post-Conflict Bosnia & Herzegovina for Forced Prostitution" and "Kosovo: Rape as a Weapon of 'Ethnic Cleansing.'"

She was also a partner at Jenner & Block LLP, where she focused on commercial litigation and investigations of companies that illegally bribed foreign governments to advance their business interests.

In 2012, she founded the Human Trafficking Legal Center with support from the Open Society Foundations. The center is a nonprofit that trains pro bono lawyers to seek restitution for victims of human trafficking. As of 2021, she has trained more than 4000 attorneys.

== Recognition ==
In 2020, she was the commencement speaker at Pomona, and was awarded an honorary doctorate.
