= Rhythm Plate =

- Also known as: Rhythm Plate
- Origin: Matlock, Derbyshire, England, United Kingdom
- Genres: House; Dance; Nu-disco; Electronica
- Occupations: Record producers remixers
- Instruments: Synthesizer – Sampler – Drum machine – Bass guitar – Electric guitar – Vocals
- Years active: 1998 to Present
- Labels: Pressed for Time Records; Vinyl Only Records; Lost My Dog Records; Winding Road Records; DiY Discs; Mantis Recordings; No Shame Records
- Members: Matt Rhythm; Ant Plate
- Website: https://soundcloud.com/rhythmplate

Rhythm Plate are predominantly a deep house production duo who formed in 1995. They consist of Matt 'Rhythm' and Ant 'Plate', who have infrequently DJed across the United Kingdom (Egg, Fabric), even less so, Europe (Sónar 2009 and 2010, Cork, Montpellier) and once around the world (San Francisco, Auckland, Brisbane, Thailand). In 2012, they played their first live gig at Fabric using extensive outboard gear; including a Roland Juno 60, a Minimoog Model D, a Korg DW-8000, various effects and mixers and two Yamaha samplers. In 2013, Rhythm Plate started a new 'vinyl only' record label called Pressed For Time Records which, despite its lack of paid publicity/PR machine interest, each of the releases have been well received by the deep/tech house community of DJs It still releases music today.

Rhythm Plate released their first, and only, studio album Off The Charts in September 2013. This saw them collaborate with several vocalists including Frank H Carter III, Clive Astin, Colin Mutchler, Mykle Anthony (14 Karat Soul), Lorna Bean (Sean Bean) and actor Johnny Ray Gill, as well working with as notable musicians, Matt Chandler (jazz guitar), Gary Reader (saxophone) and Richard Heacock (strings).

They have written incidental music that has been featured on several UK and US television shows, most notably CSI: Miami. They have also remixed other artists including Mark Ronson, The Frames, Amp Fiddler, Martin Iveson, Inland Knights and had tracks featured on music compilations released by Renaissance, Global Underground and Hed Kandi amongst others.

== Discography ==
Year	Album	Label
2013	Off the charts	Lost My Dog Records
2020	It's not an album, it's a doublepack e.p	Pressed For Time Records

=== Singles and EPs ===
Year	Song	Label
1999	"Masters at Wirksworth EP"	DiY Discs
1999	"Prospect Drive"	Mantis Recordings
2000	"Breathe (Again)" Where's Miami EP	No Shame/Mantis Recordings
2002	"New Jack Infection EP"	Bluem Recordings
2002	"Neutral Solutions EP"	Procreation
2002	"Lean"	Mantis Recordings
2003	"Flames High"	Roam Records
2003	"Divine Strategies EP"	Losonofono
2004	"Straight Outta Cromford EP"	DiY Discs
2005	"Bless"	Losonofono
2005	"You Couldn't EP"	Flat & Round Records
2006	"ABCDE EP"	Winding Road Records
2007	"Robbin' Hudd"	Hudd Traxx
2007	"Music From Our Souls EP"	Winding Road Records
2009	"Dirty"	Kolour Recordings
2013	"Lean"	Pressed For Time Records
2013	"Owl House You EP"	Pressed For Time Records
2013	"Re-Masters at Wirksworth EP"	Pressed For Time Records
2014	"Casual Relief EP"	Pressed For Time Records
2015	"No More (feat. Sarah Jay)"	Pressed For Time Records
2018	"Point of Data EP"	Vinyl Only Records
2023	"Codependency EP"	Vinyl Only Records

== Remixes ==
Year	Artist	Song	Remix Name	Label
1998	AtJazz	Wind & Sea	"Rhythm Plate's Windy Sea"	DiY Discs
2002	Inland Knights	17 Days	"Rhythm Plate's Heading Home"	Procreation
2010	Mark Ronson	Somebody To Love Me	"Rhythm Plate's Jack Mix '87"	Colombia
2010	Mark Ronson	Bang Bang Bang	"Rhythm Plate's Bangin' Disco Edit"	Colombia
2010	Mark Ronson	Bang Bang Bang	"Rhythm Plate's Dub Plate"	Colombia
2011	The Frames	Rise	"Rhythm Plate's Hi-Rise Reconstruction"	Anti-
2011	Experimental Products	Glowing in the Dark	"Rhythm Plate's Ready Brek Re-wire"	Short Circuit Records
