= Lifelong Learning Networks =

Lifelong Learning Networks (LLNs) were a joint initiative in the UK between the Higher Education Funding Council for England (HEFCE), the Learning and Skills Council (LSC) and the former Department for Education and Skills (DfES). They were created as a result of HEFCE/LSC Circular Letter 12/2004.

In June 2004, they invited Further Education Colleges (FECs) and Higher Education Institutions (HEIs) to forge partnerships, bringing together different types of learning provider in a single network. These networks would provide fresh opportunities for progression to higher education for vocational and work-based learners, supporting vocational education, learner development and lifelong learning.

== See also ==
- Higher Futures - LLN for South Yorkshire, North Derbyshire and North Nottinghamshire
