= Fox Hagg =

Nature Reserve in Sheffield, South Yorkshire, England

Coordinates: 53.375°N 1.578°W

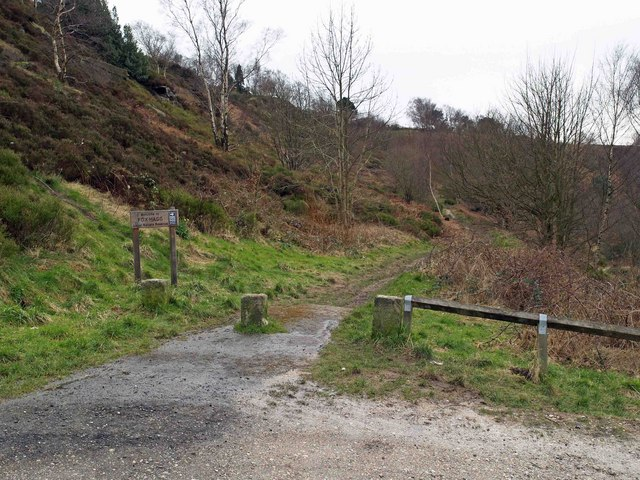
Entrance to Fox Hagg

Fox Hagg is a small (33.25 hectares (82.2 acres)) nature reserve in the Rivelin Valley area of Sheffield, England. The Allen Sike flows along the north edge of the reserve and the River Rivelin flows through the reserve from Rivelin Dams to the west. The Wyming Brook Nature Reserve borders Fox Hagg to the west. The site is managed by the Wildlife Trust for Sheffield and Rotherham.

== Geology ==
The geology of the steep rocky hillside comprises sediments of sandstone, gritstone, mudstone conglomerates and impermeable shales, all dating from the Carboniferous period and indicative of a fluvial environment. Peat, formed in the Quaternary period, three million years ago, has been identified by the British Geological Survey.

== History ==
Permanent settlements were established during the Neolithic and Bronze Age with evidence of tree clearance indicating early agricultural exploitation of the land. During the Medieval Period agriculture continued into the valley bottom, with the steeper slopes being reserved for grazing. Walls erected in the post Medieval Era indicate land enclosure at that time. The area was once managed as a holly hagg, where the soft spikeless upper leaves of holly were cut for winter fodder for sheep and cattle. The site is now managed to encourage wildlife and was designated as a local nature reserve in 2004.

== Wildlife ==
=== Birds ===
Birds identified at the nature reserve include yellowhammer, lesser redpoll, common linnet, willow tit, bullfinch, song thrush, meadow and tree pipits and wood warbler, dunnock (Prunella modularis), and common cuckoo. The Eurasian blackcap (Sylvia atricapilla), common blackbird (Turdus merulus), and great tit (Parus major) are common at the reserve. Osprey (Pandion haliaetus) and lapwing (Vanellus vanellus) have been seen overflying the site. A number of species of high conservation concern, the song thrush and willow tit have been observed at the reserve.

=== Amphibians and reptiles ===
Common toads and viviparous lizards have been seen at the site.

=== Mammals ===
A small mammal survey, carried out in 2005, indicated that voles, field mice and pygmy shrew lived at the reserve. Grey squirrel are known to inhabit the site. Roe deer are known to visit the reserve.

=== Invertebrates ===
Two locally uncommon species of flies, Myopa buceata and Servillea ursine, are found at the site. The dead wood beetles, Triplax aenea and Orchesia undulata have been recorded at the nature reserve. The heather beetle (Lochmaea suturalis) is common. The moth, Coleophora vitisella, has been found at the site. The hoverfly, Cheilosia albipila and the orange tip butterfly (Anthocharis cardamines), favour the marshy conditions found at wetland locations within the reserve.

== Flora ==
=== Invasive species ===
Himalayan balsam (Impatiens glandulifera), an invasive species is controlled by strimming and hand pulling. In the past Asulox, a fern-specific herbicide, has been used on the site to reduce the amount of bracken at the reserve. Work to thin the wooded areas of the site have been funded by the Forestry Commission, as has the installation post and rail fence at the Lodge Lane car park.

=== Broad-leaved woodland ===
The site has mixture of habitats, including broad-leaved woodland, which is dominated by oak, birch and rowan. Alder and willow are found in wetland areas of the reserve.

=== Heathland ===
There are 4.8 hectares (12 acres) of heathland at the nature reserve. This is dominated by bilberry, with areas of bracken, bramble and wavy hair-grass.

== Facilities ==
The nature reserve is crossed by a number of public rights of way, including both footpaths and bridleways. The reserve has parking for five vehicles at the Lodge Lane entrance to the site. Additional parking is available at the Rivelin Dams to the north west of the reserve. The condition of the site is monitored by Sheffield City Council as part of their Sheffield Local Biodiversity Action Plan.

== Artistic representation ==
The hillside at Fox Hagg, just below Lodge Moor, was painted in 1941 by Lionel Maurice de Sausmarez ARA.

W. E. Smith depicted the valley from a vantage point at Bell Hagg, overlooking the reserve, c. 1966.
