= River Rivelin =

River in South Yorkshire, England

Coordinates: 53°24′N 1°30′W

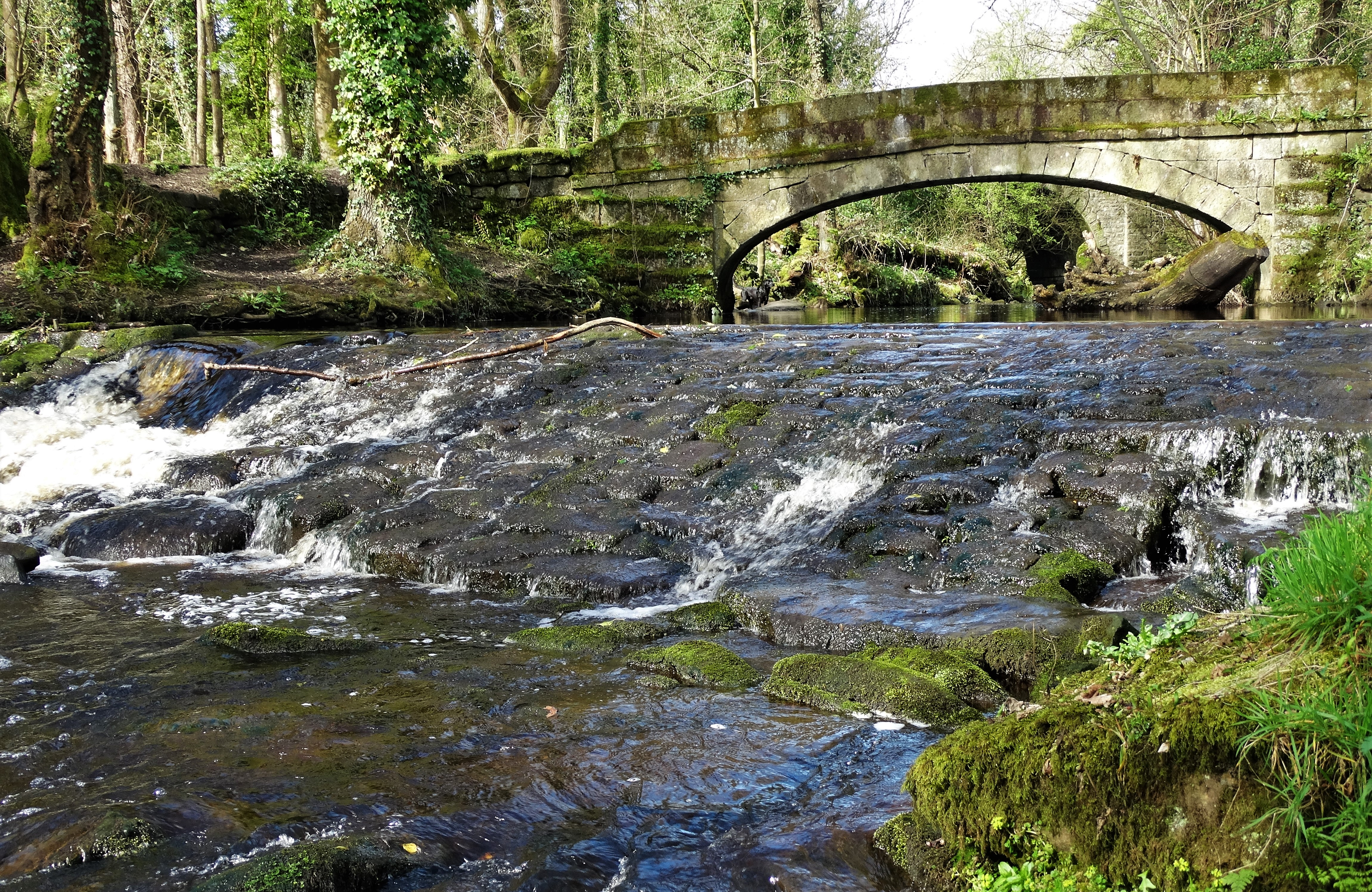
- The river near the old Packhorse Bridge

Location
- Country: England

Physical characteristics
- Source
  - location: Pennines
- Length: 8 mi (13 km)

The River Rivelin is a river in Sheffield, South Yorkshire, England. It rises on the Hallam moors, in north west Sheffield, and joins the River Loxley (at Malin Bridge). The Rivelin Valley, through which the river flows, is a 3 1/2-mile (5.6 km) long woodland valley that includes the popular Rivelin Valley Nature Trail that was created in 1967. The valley has farmland on its gentler upper slopes. Tributaries include the Wyming Brook, Allen Sike and the Black Brook. The Rivelin Dams are to be found at the head of the valley.

A relatively fast-flowing river (it drops 80 metres (260 ft) between Rivelin Mill Bridge and Malin Bridge), the Rivelin is fed by a constant release of water from the nearby moorland peat. Its flow was exploited for centuries as a power source, driving the water wheels of up to twenty industries (forges, metal-working and flour mills) along its course.

== History ==
=== Roman times ===
There is evidence of Roman occupation of the area which comes from tablets found in April 1761 on the Stannington side of the Rivelin Valley which record the granting of land to retiring Roman auxiliaries of the Sunuci tribe. Other evidence of Roman occupation comes from finds on Walkley Bank Road, which leads onto the ridge facing Stannington.

=== Medieval times ===
In medieval times the Rivelin valley was part of a large tract of land set aside by the Lords of Hallamshire for deer hunting. It was known as Rivelin Chase or Firth and covered thousands of acres on the western upland outskirts of the parish of Sheffield. In 1637 John Harrison after surveying the area declared that the firth had an area of 6,863 acres (2,777 ha). 5,531 acres (2,238 ha) of this was within Sheffield Parish with the rest in the Parish of Bradfield. Until the 20th century the River Rivelin formed the north-western boundary of Sheffield.

=== Industrial past ===
The Valley possesses 21 artificially created ponds, testament to the twenty mills which were once present on the river. Though most of the mills and forges no longer exist, the ponds which used to feed them do, thanks to the support of the Rivelin Valley Conservation Group (RVCG) and Yorkshire Water. Some of the more famous mills (from west to east) are as follows:

==== Rivelin Corn Mill ====
The mostly westerly site, stands at the foot of Rails Road. This mill dates from 1600 when it was owned by Gilbert Talbot, 7th Earl of Shrewsbury. By 1830 there were two waterwheels powering three grinding stones, however problems with the water supply in the summer meant that the mill was often not working at full capacity. The mill continued operating until the 1930s after which the buildings quickly fell into disrepair and were demolished in the early 1950s with a small car parking area now occupying the site. The dam wall was damaged in 1967 by dredging work and eventually collapsed in March 2001. The RVCG and Sheffield Council filled in the pond and created a new one nearby with a pond dipping platform. The official opening was on 17 May 2007.

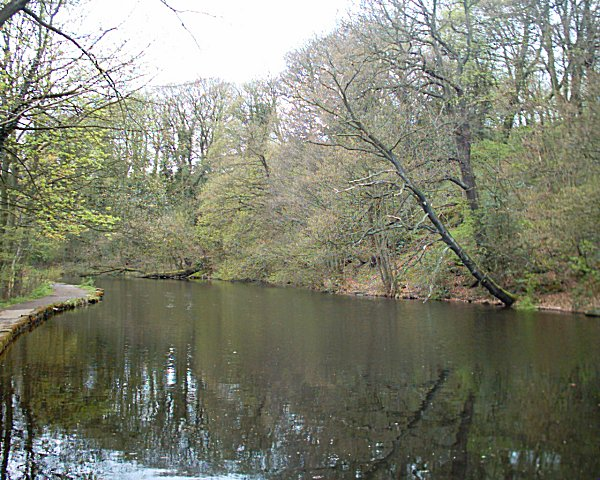
The Wolf Wheel pond

==== Wolf Wheel ====
Was built around 1722 and had one of the largest wheels in the valley with a diameter of 15 feet (4.6 m). It was owned by the Windle brothers between 1818 and 1852 who used it for grinding knives and razors, after which it was sold to the Water Company. The mill was in regular use until 1918, but a survey in 1934 revealed that the internal machinery had been dismantled. The pond that served the Wolf Wheel is still in fine condition and has received much attention from the RVCG. It is one of four dams that are used by fishermen in the valley and surrounding wildlife includes dragonflies such as the common darter Sympetrum striolatum and the common hawker, Aeshna juncea. Other wildlife includes kingfishers, great diving beetles and amphibians such as the common frog and palmate newt.

==== Hind Wheel Mill ====
This is oldest mill in the valley with a recorded date of 1581 when Thomas Hind, Robert Webster and John Swynden were the owners paying £1 per year rent. It was completely rebuilt around 1820 with production ceasing around 1930. In October 1936 "The Sheffield Daily Independent" reported that the building had completely disappeared. The present day Round Pond which served the mill is one of the most popular in the area being stocked with trout for anglers; the surrounding area has a large variety of wildlife and there is a picnic area.

==== Nether Cut Wheel ====
Situated near the "S" bend on the A6101, the Nether Cut was the last mill to work in the valley; it was still grinding scythes until 1939 and was not demolished until 1956. The mill suffered some unrest and damage during the Sheffield Outrages in 1874 for using non-union labour.

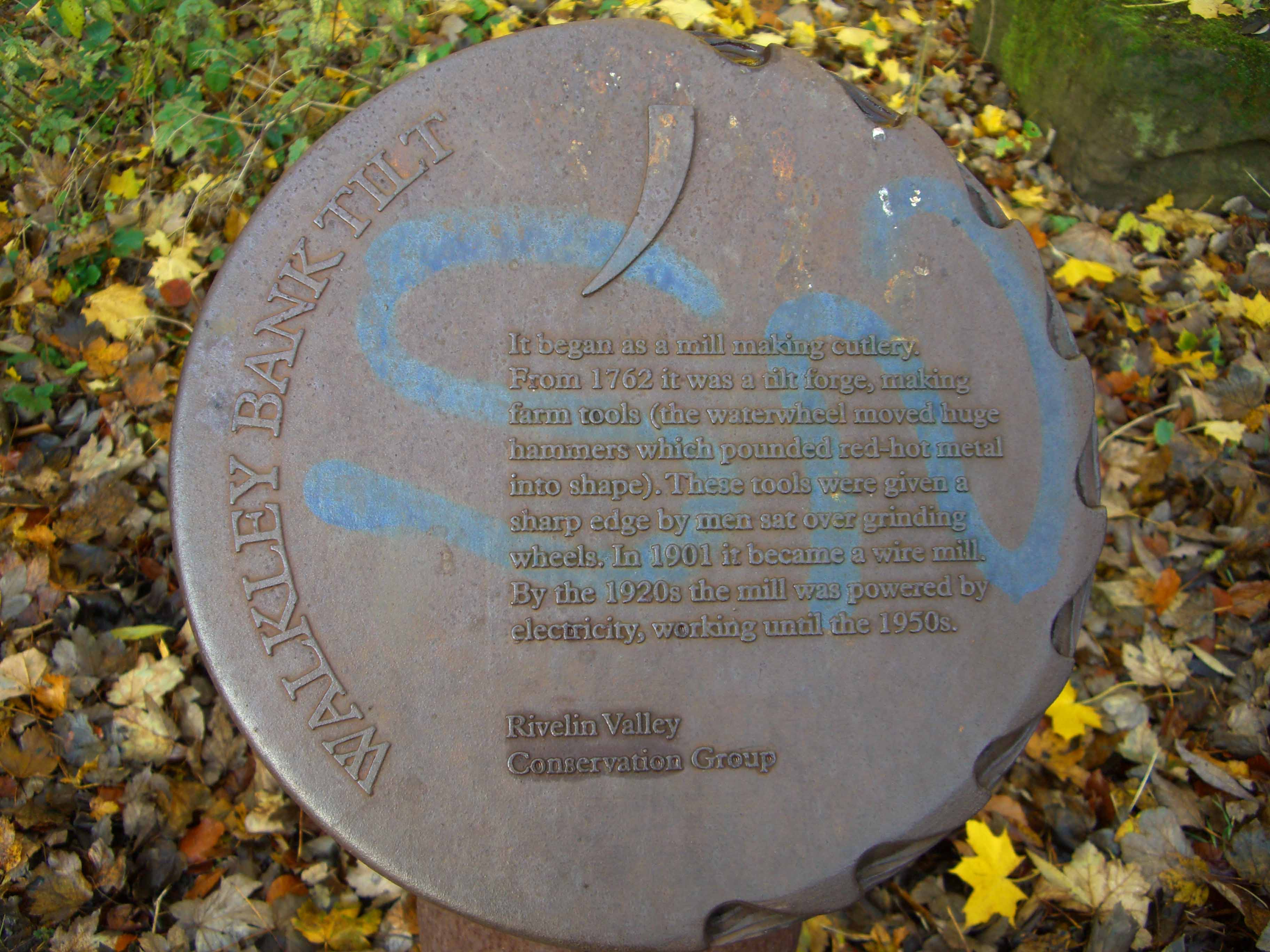
Cast iron marker at Walkley Bank Tilt, sadly vandalised.

==== Walkley Bank Tilt ====
This began as a mill making cutlery around 1750. From 1762 it was a tilt forge making farming tools before becoming a wire mill in 1901. In the 1920s it was converted to electrical power. It was one of the last mills in the valley to close as it was still working in the 1950s. The area around the dam has been upgraded for recreational use with a small car park and bench seating. The dam is popular with anglers and has a large colony of waterfowl.

==== Mousehole Forge ====
Located close to Malin Bridge, the forge dates back to 1628 when it was known for iron smelting and bar production. However the forge became world-famous for producing anvils which were greatly commended and won a gold medal at The Great Exhibition of 1851. It is said that the anvil at Gretna Green was made by the Mousehole Forge. Production ceased in 1933 and part of the forge is now a private house.

==== Grogham Wheel ====
This was the last mill in the valley before the Rivelin's confluence with the River Loxley. It had two waterwheels, with the largest known as "Groggy" being the biggest in the valley. The mill ground files and cutlery and was the only one in the valley to be damaged by the Great Sheffield Flood due to the water backing up the valley. The mill stopped production in 1933 with the buildings being demolished in August 1935 for public safety.

== Wildlife ==
The river valley is home to wildlife including mallard, the dipper, the kingfisher, the long-tailed tit, grey heron and the wren. At Fox Hagg nature reserve on the south side of the river it is possible to see meadow and tree pipits, common redstarts and linnets and a number of warblers.

== Rivelin Valley Road ==
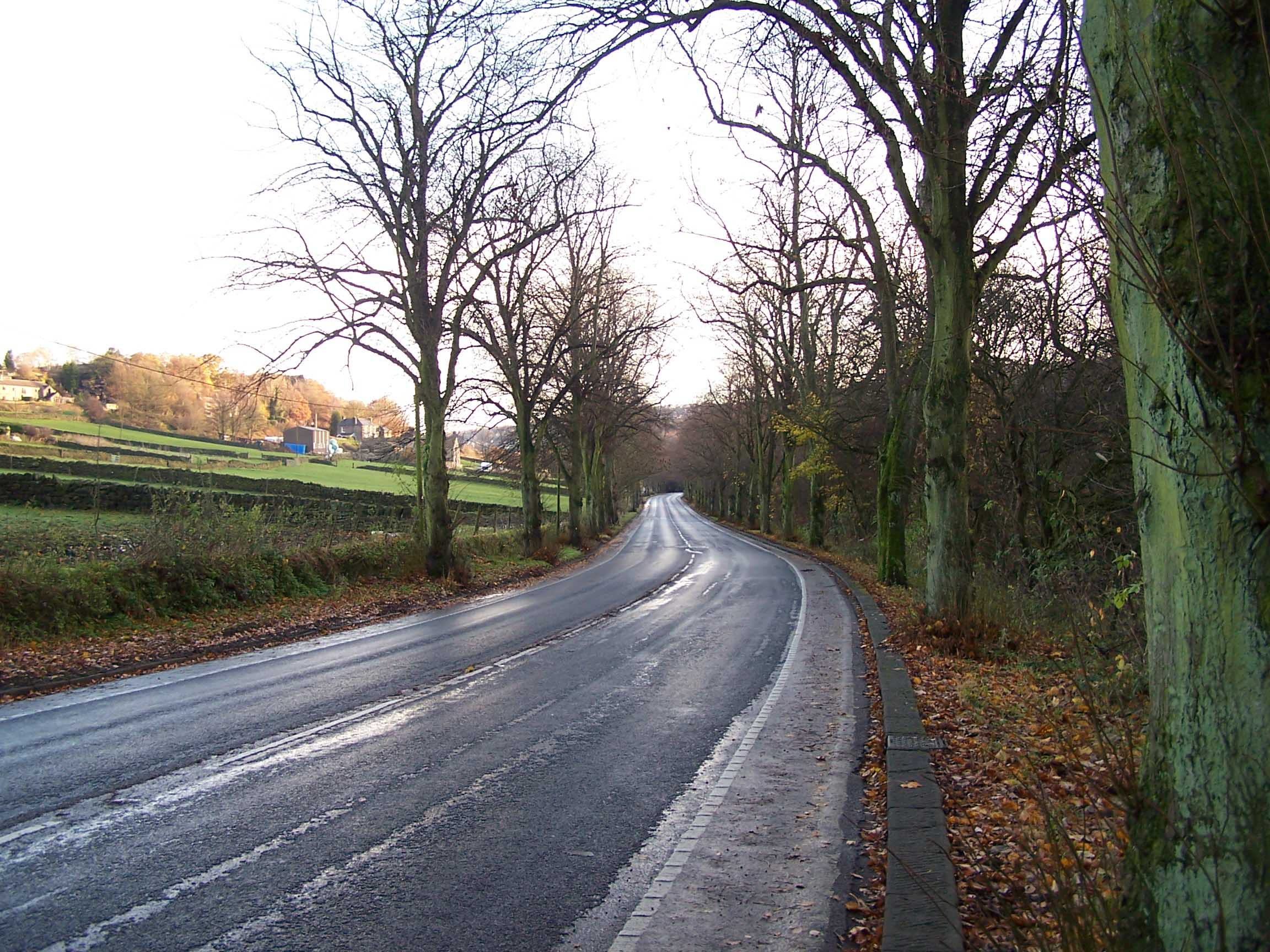
A long stretch of Rivelin Valley Road with its lime trees lining it.

Rivelin Valley Road was built in 1907 between Malin Bridge and Rivelin Mill Bridge to connect with the main Sheffield to Manchester road, now the A57. Prior to this the valley had no road, just a series of cart tracks connecting the various industrial mills. The building of the road was proposed in 1905 by the local water board, which owned the land; the Duke of Norfolk also donated 4.5 hectares of his land in the area for the project. Work started in November 1905 and provided employment for 176 unemployed men. The unemployment rate was particularly high at the time and the opportunity to provide work was a contributing factor in making the decision to build the road. Raw materials for the construction of the road were provided by Clough Field quarry on the southern slopes of the valley below Crosspool. Over 700 lime trees were purchased from Dixon's of Chester in 1906 at a cost of £147. The limes were planted to line the road for a distance of 3.5 miles (5.6 km), making it the second longest lime tree avenue in Britain. The road was opened on 1 September 1907, although work was not completed until June 1908. The final cost of construction was £30,000. Local people quickly christened the road "The New Road", a name which was still being used many years later. The success of the project in providing work for the unemployed prompted Sheffield Corporation to press ahead with plans to connect the new road with the Sheffield suburbs of Crookes and Walkley. Rivelin Valley Road is now designated as the A6101.

The valley was especially loved by the "corn law rhymer" Ebenezer Elliott. There is a rock by the side of Black Brook with his name carved on it where he was renowned to sit and appreciate nature. Elliott wrote the lyrical poem "Farewell To Rivelin" in honour of the valley, with the lines:

Beautiful river! goldenly shining,
Where, with the cistus, woodbines are twining,
Birklands around thee, mountains above thee,
Rivelin wildest! Do I not love thee.

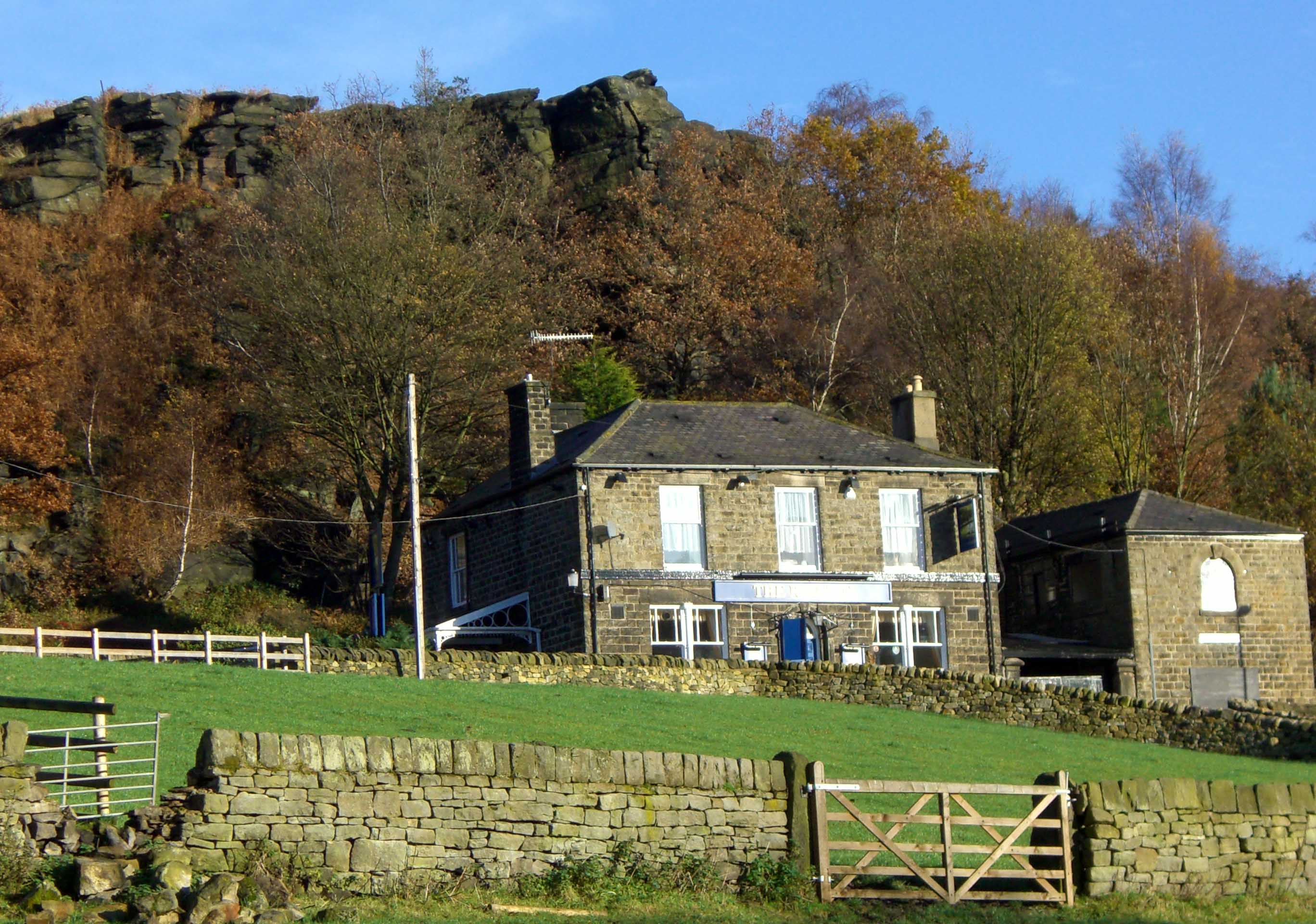
The Rivelin public house.

== Landmarks ==
As well as industrial heritage, the valley is home to much wildlife, now protected by the Rivelin Valley Conservation Group. The upper part of the valley is flanked to the north by Rivelin Rocks. The rocks re-emerge three kilometres (2 miles) further down the valley above the Rivelin Hotel or "The Rivelin" on Tofts Lane. Behind the hotel is the Man's Head Rock, a once well known rock formation shown on many postcards, now hidden by mature trees. This is the only public house in the rural part of the valley; the premises were formerly farm buildings before being converted into a pub. Another public house, the Holly Bush, is situated further down the valley, closer to Malin Bridge. One of the most distinguished buildings in the valley is the former King Edward VII Hospital, a Grade II listed building, the hospital closed in 1992 and has now been converted into apartments. St Michael's Cemetery, a Catholic burial ground is situated at the Malin Bridge end of the valley. Across the road from St. Michael's is the Rivelin Valley Park a small public recreation area which includes a cafe, playground and the Rivelin splash pools which were opened in July 2013 to replace the old outdated paddling pools.

== Proposed flood defence scheme ==
In September 2014 Sheffield City Council announced plans to construct a dam wall in the valley at one of two possible locations, the Swallow/Wolf flood storage area or the Roscoe/New Dam flood storage area. After public consultation plans for the Swallow/Wolf flood storage area have since been dropped but the Roscoe/New Dam flood storage area remains as an option. The dam will be over 36-foot (11 m) high with a 13-foot (4 m) wide crest. If the scheme goes ahead, it will reduce the depth of water downstream by 4 feet 11 inches (1.5 m) during heavy rain such as those that occurred in 2007 United Kingdom floods when parts of the city were flooded. This proposal is likely to be highly controversial if goes ahead: the water retaining area would cover and potentially destroy or damage ancient and unique structures that are part of Sheffield's industrial heritage. It would also flood allotment gardens and would require the river course to change as well as to have the span of the valley that includes the nature trail covered by the dam embankment. The culvert (a concrete tunnel - maybe barred) to take the river may have to be as long as 70 metres. There is further debate about the contribution the Rivelin played in the floods of 2007 so the maths related to this scheme will be closely scrutinised by the very concerned public. (In the council consultation 60% of people expressing an opinion opposed this scheme - indeed it was the least popular area the council nominated).

In 2025 Yorkshire Water announced plans to construct a 2,500m³ storm tank to be installed on land owned by the Sheffield Methodist Circuit at Calver Fields, Hagg Lane, with the intention that it is used in periods of heavy rainfall to reduce run-off into the river. The plan has been met with opposition from nearby residents. Work to excavate the site of the storm tank is expected to begin in July 2026.

== Artistic representations ==
In the 1920s a group of artists founded a creative colony in the Rivelin Valley. They included Ben Baines, W R E Goodrich, Robert Scott-Temple and Vernon Edmonds. A number of other artists are known to have worked in the Rivelin area.

- W. J. Stevenson (1835–1905) depicted the interior of Spooner's Wheel in 1877.
- W. E. Smith depicted the valley from a vantage point at Bell Hagg circa1966 .
- Joseph Hallam Hawkesworth (1827–1908) depicted the river.
- G. Hattersley Pearson (1858–1937) painted Roscoe Wheel circa1890.
- Christopher Thomson (1799–1871) depicted the Rivelin, near the confluence of the Black Brook circa 1860.
- Joseph Wrightson MacIntyre (1842–1897) painted the interior of Holme Head Wheel in 1879.
