= Rivelin Dams =

Reservoirs in South Yorkshire, England

Coordinates: 53.3779°N 1.5936°W

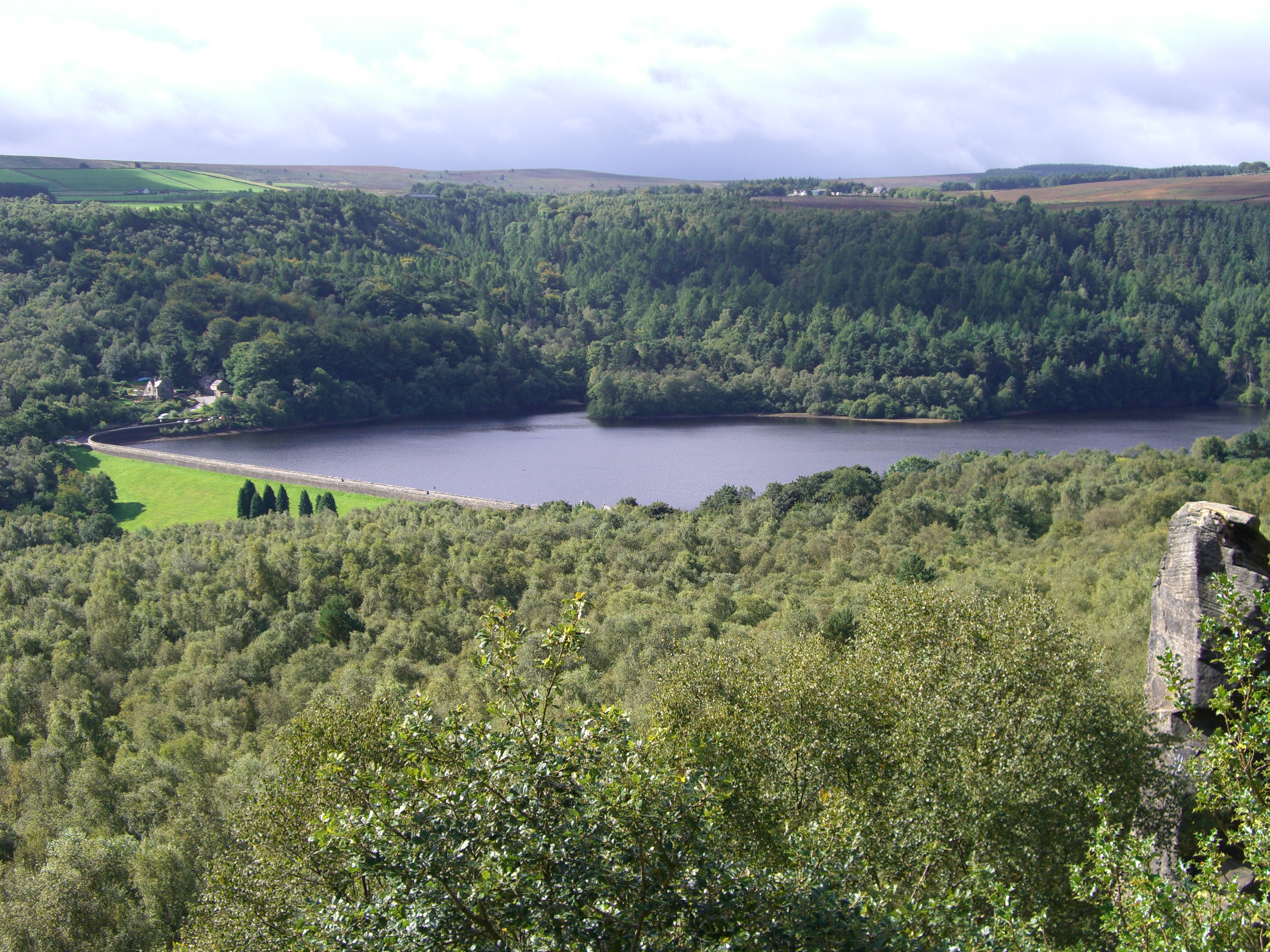
The Lower reservoir seen from Rivelin Rocks, 0.6 miles (1 km) to the north-east

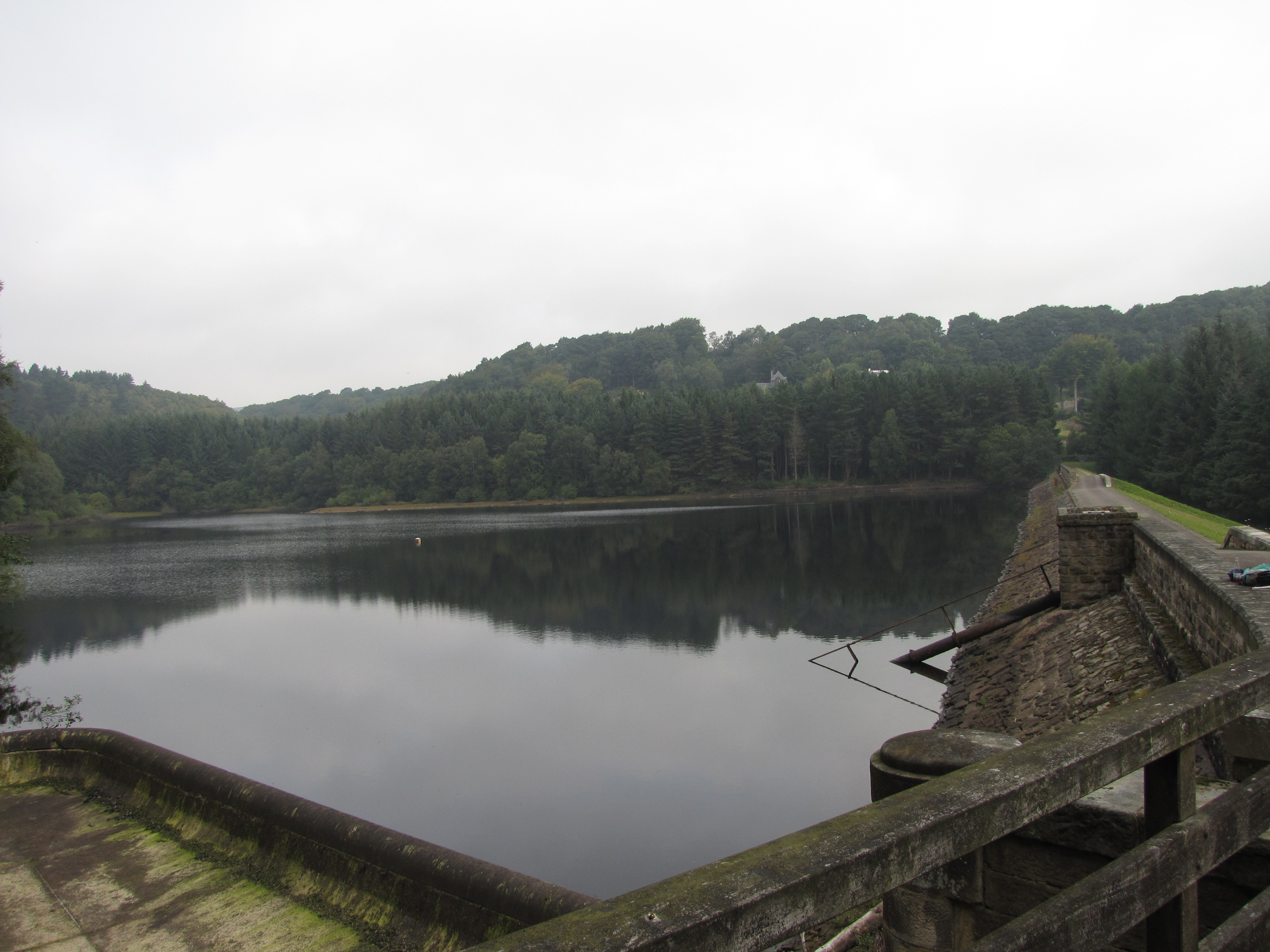
The Upper reservoir from the dam wall

Rivelin Dams are a pair of water storage reservoirs situated in the upper part of the Rivelin Valley, 5 miles (8 km) west of Sheffield in South Yorkshire, England. The dams are owned by Yorkshire Water and provide water to 319,000 people as well as compensation water for the River Rivelin. They are named Upper and Lower and fall just within the eastern boundary of the Peak District.

== Description ==
The Lower reservoir is the larger of the two and has easier public access with a tarmac road giving vehicular access to a small car park at the southern end of the dam wall. Access to the Upper reservoir and the woodland around it is by permit, there is a track with a locked gate which gives access for water board vehicles from the A57 road. The Lower reservoir has a capacity of 175 million imperial gallons (800,000 m^{3}), with a surface area of 12 hectares (30 acres), the dam height is 20 metres (66 feet) and its length is approximately 300 metres (980 feet). The Upper reservoir has a capacity of 48.4 million imperial gallons (220,000 m^{3}), with a surface area of 4 hectares (9.9 acres), the dam height is 12 metres (39 feet) with an approximate length of 220 metres. Both the dam walls are faced with stone pitching in the upstream direction and have grass banking in the downstream direction. In 2005 the dam wall of the Lower reservoir underwent strengthening work undertaken by the firm Hesselberg Hydro who used open stone asphalt to face the upstream embankment.

The two reservoirs are fed by streams which drain the Hallam Moors which lie to the immediate west and stretch up to Stanage Edge. The reservoirs have a catchment area of 765 hectares (1,890 acres) which has an annual average rainfall of 39.5 inches (1,000 millimetres). A former reservoir keeper's house stands at the northern end of the Lower reservoir's dam wall; this is now a private dwelling.

== History ==
Water provision for the growing city of Sheffield was taken over by the private Sheffield Waterworks Company in 1830. The Rivelin Dams were part of a series of reservoirs subsequently built to the west of the city by the company with the Lower being completed in 1845 and the Upper in 1848. When the company's plans to build the Rivelin Dams were approved, a proviso was inserted into the agreement which stipulated that they must supply 3,210,338 imperial gallons (14,594.49 m^{3}) per day of compensation water into the River Rivelin for the benefit of the mill owners and other users further downstream. In the second half of the 19th century this compensation water often had to be provided by letting water enter the Rivelin valley from the nearby Redmires Reservoirs which was not an ideal situation. In the early 1900s it was decided to build the Rivelin Tunnel as an alternative way of providing compensation water from the Upper Derwent Valley.

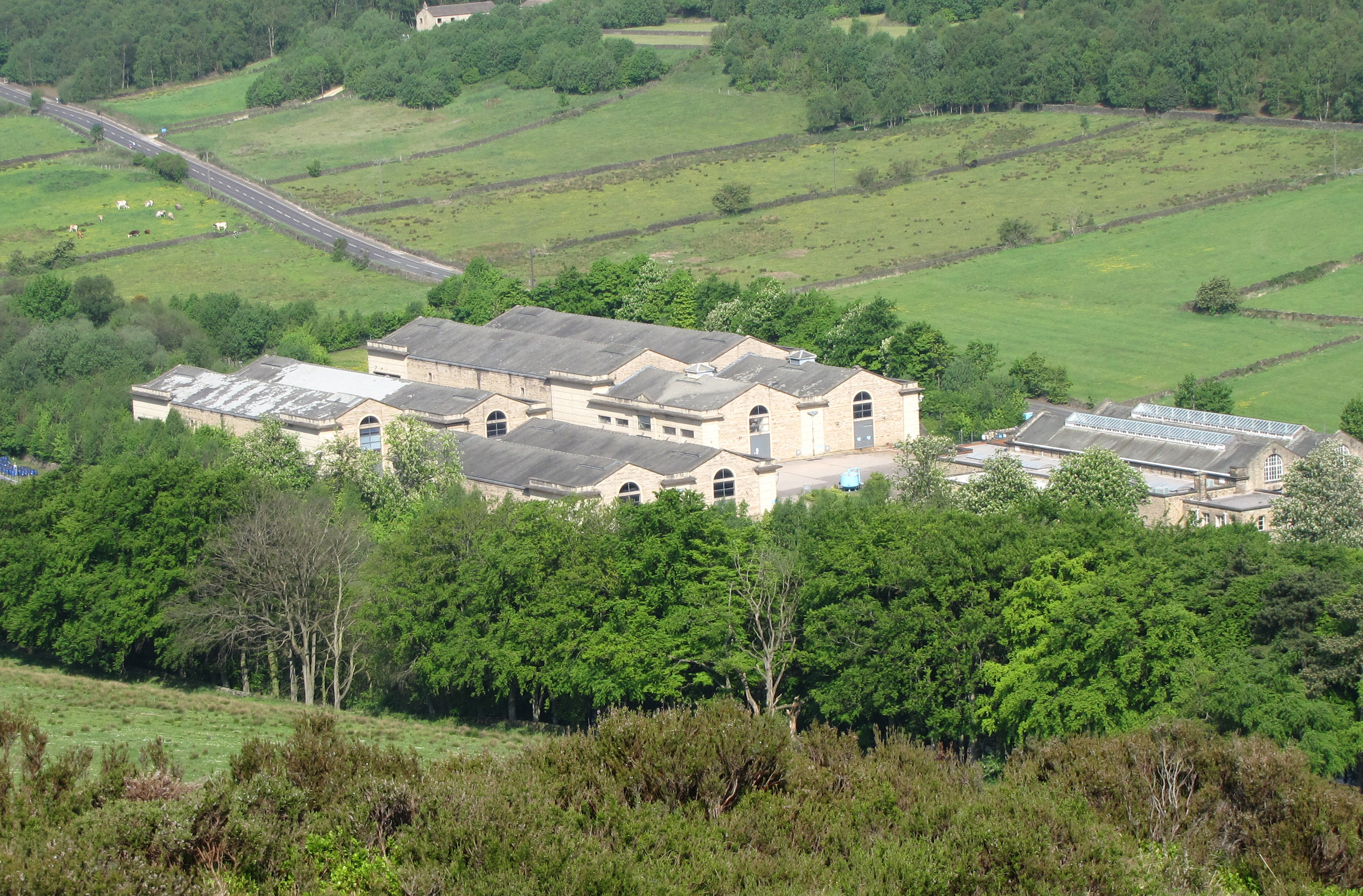
Rivelin water treatment works from Lodge Moor

=== Rivelin tunnel ===
Construction of the tunnel began in 1903 and was completed in 1909. It was built to use the plentiful supplies of the River Derwent as compensation water for the River Rivelin rather than draining the more valuable waters of Redmires Reservoirs. The tunnel is 4.5 miles (7.2 km) long, 6 ft 6 in (1.98 m) high and 6 ft (1.8 m) wide, it has a fall towards Rivelin of 1 in 3,600 which is 6 ft 7in (2.0m) over its entire length. The tunnel takes water which has come through a drain hole in the south east corner of Ladybower Reservoir and delivers it into the Lower Rivelin Reservoir with the tunnel emerging into a grass covered underground tank on the south bank at a point next to where the Wyming Brook enters the Lower reservoir. The tunnel cost £135,151, which was £13,000 under budget. A series of sighting towers was constructed to aid in the survey of the tunnel. The collapsed remains of one tower can be found on Stanage Edge. An extant tower stands by the footpath adjacent to Redmires Upper Reservoir conduit. An electric railway ran through Rivelin Tunnel when it was under construction.

=== Rivelin water treatment works ===
The water treatment works stand 800 metres east (downstream) of the dam wall of the Lower reservoir. The works were constructed in 1913 and pumped 7.5 million imperial gallons (34,000 m^{3}) per day of treated Rivelin water to the Hadfield service reservoir at Crookesmoor to supply the City of Sheffield. Further improvements in 1946 increased the flow to Hadfield reservoir to 12 million imperial gallons (55,000 m^{3}) per day. The works also pump Rivelin water up to the Redmires water main against a head of 400 feet (120 m). In 2008 the civil engineering company J.N. Bentley installed a 120 kW turbine at the inlet of the works to generate renewable energy; this energy is then used at the works.

In December 2015 work started on a £24 million project to upgrade the treatment works. The construction of a new building to house new clarifying settlement tanks took place just to the west of the existing works and was carried out by the contractors Mott MacDonald Bentley. The project was completed in December 2017.

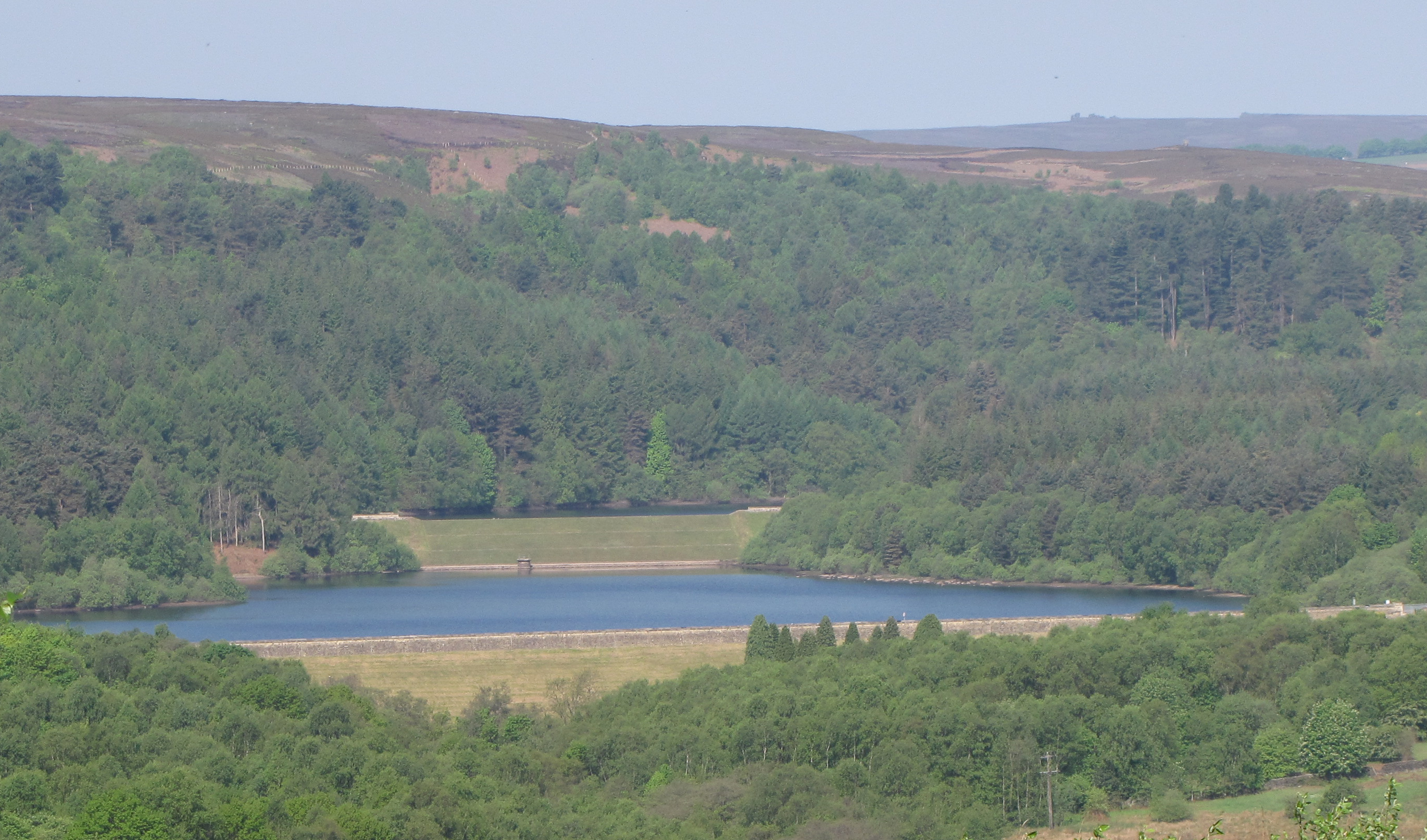
The dams and their environment seen from Lodge Moor

== Flora and fauna ==
The reservoirs are surrounded by the Wyming Brook Nature Reserve which is part of the Eastern Peak District Moors Site of Special Scientific Interest. Wildlife in the reserve includes northern spinach and common lutestring moths as well as a host of birds both on and off the water. These include crossbill, white-throated dipper, mallard, coot, moorhen and grey heron; occasional visitors include cormorant, Canada goose and osprey. The flora around the reservoirs consist mostly of deciduous and evergreen woodland; in autumn many species of fungi are on display including Jew‘s ear, plums and custard and amethyst deceiver. In recent years Yorkshire Water have conducted trials on releasing different volumes of water from the Lower reservoir and monitoring the effects on the River Rivelin. This has resulted in being able to create better conditions for brown trout spawning and an increase in the population of bullhead.
