= Rivelin Rocks =

Climbing areas of England

Coordinates: 53.38182°N 1.58203°W

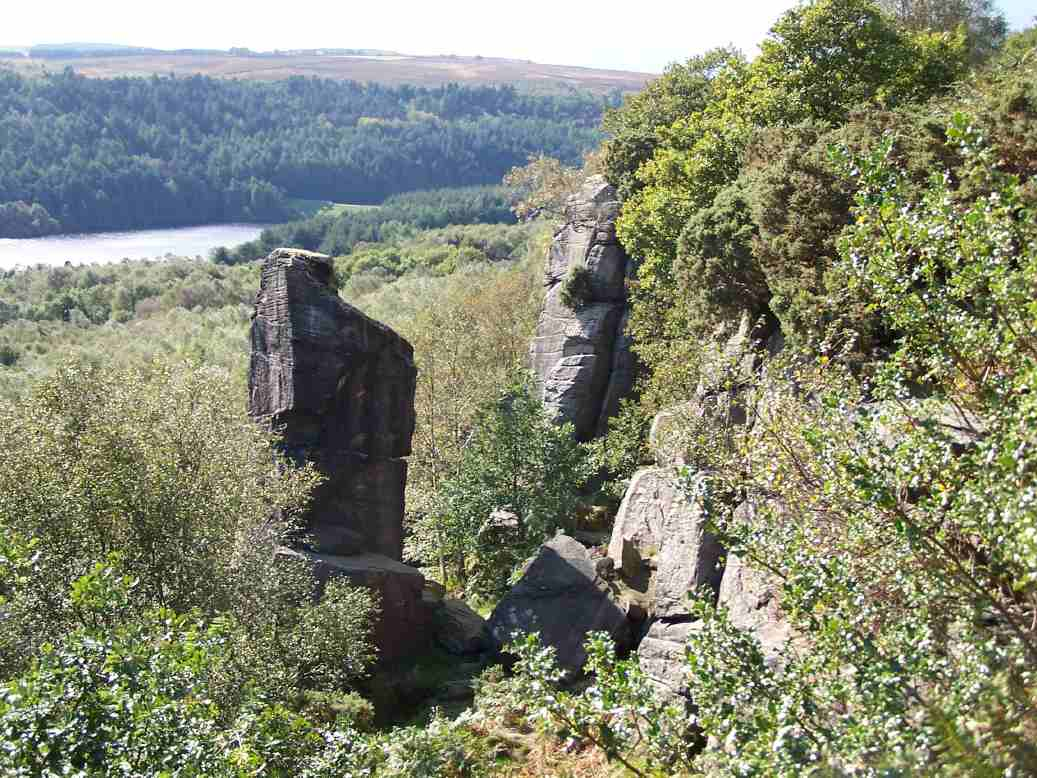
Rivelin Rocks with the Needle in front and Rivelin Dams in the background.

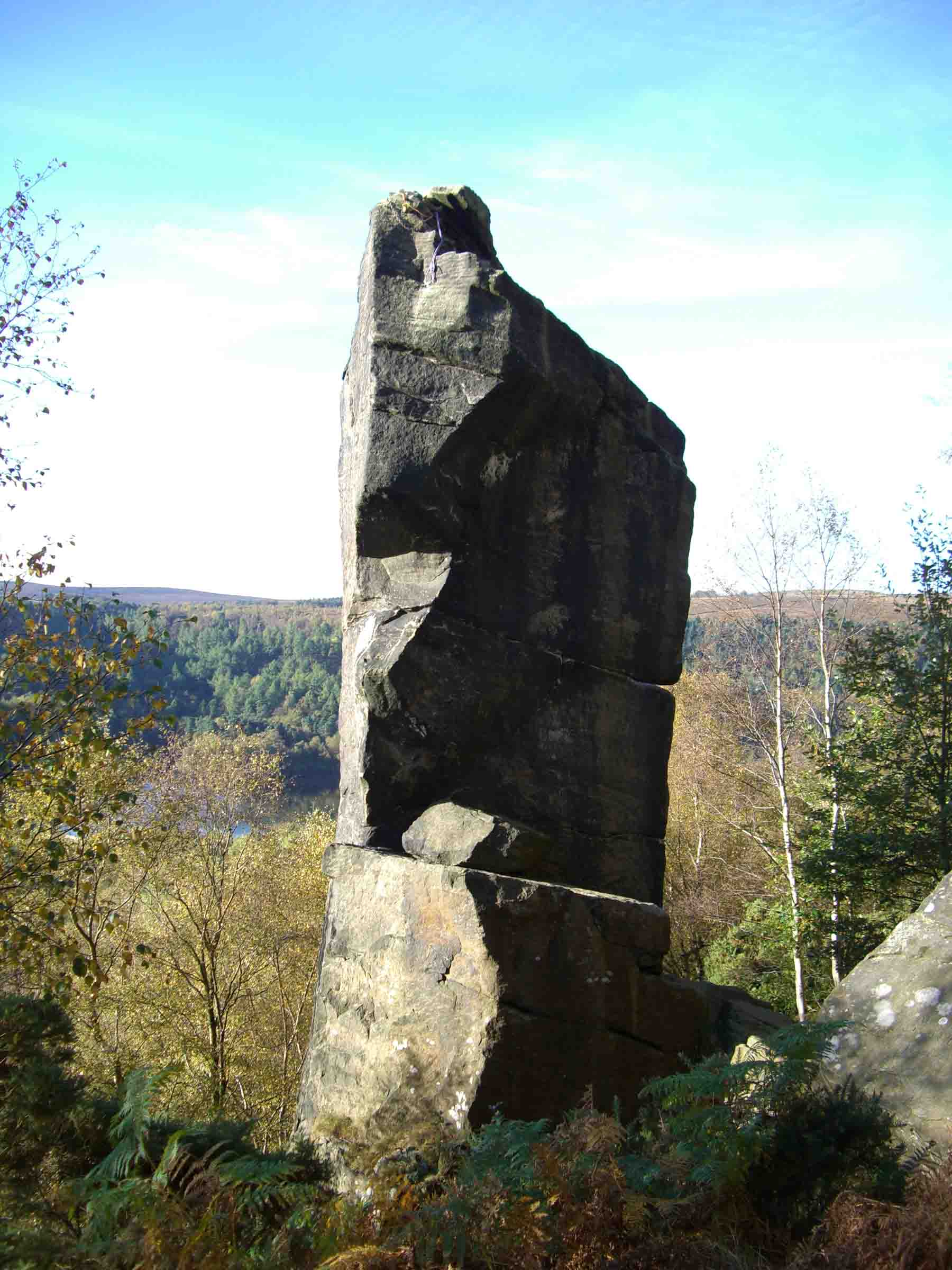
A close up of the Needle.

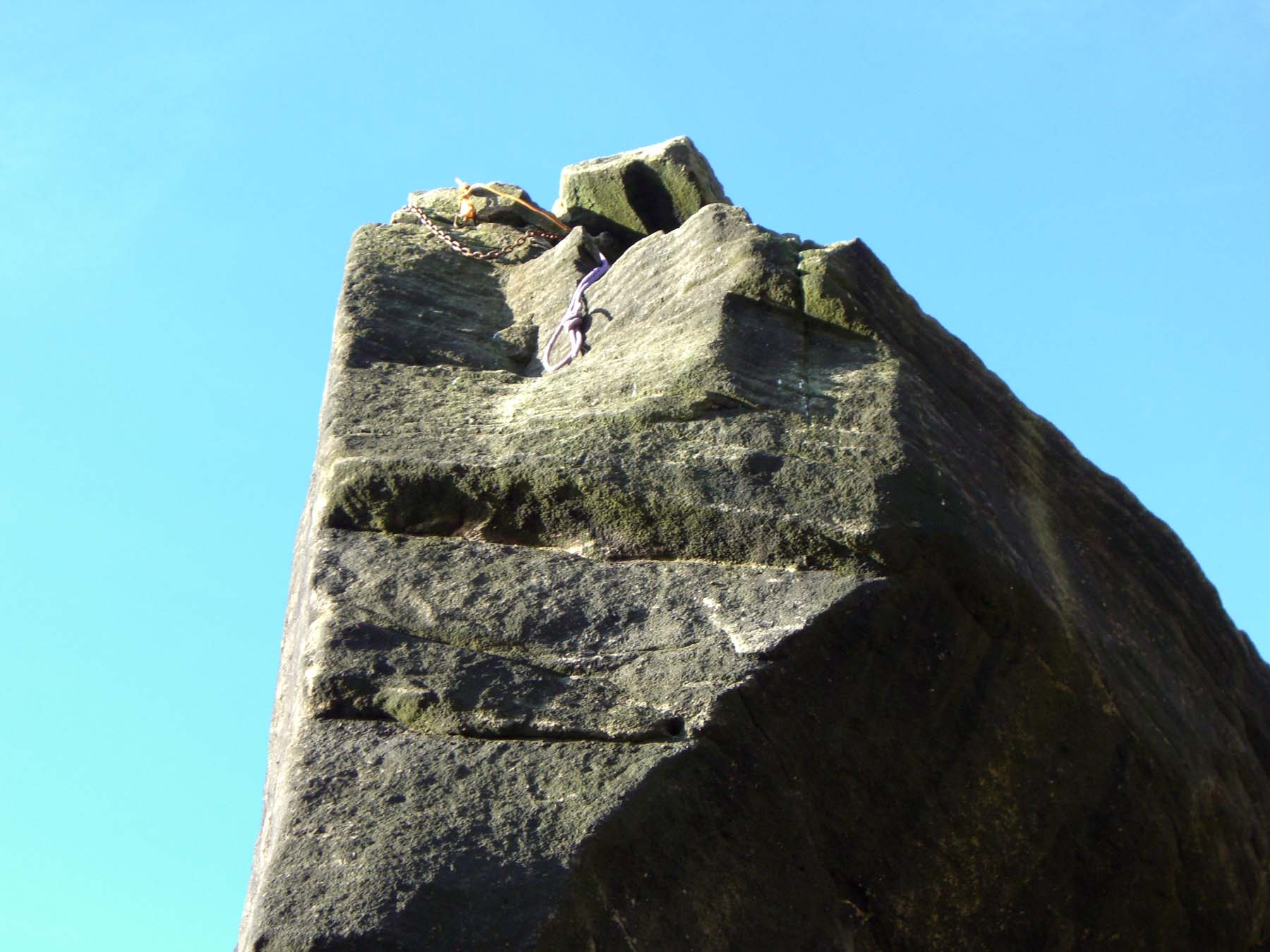
The tip of the Needle showing the metal chain used for abseiling off.

Rivelin Rocks are a gritstone edge or escarpment in the upper Rivelin Valley at grid reference SK279873, 9 kilometres (5.6 mi) west of Sheffield just off the A57 road in the county of South Yorkshire, England.

== Overview ==
The rocks reach a height above sea level of approximately 270 metres (890 ft) and are popular with rock climbers and to a lesser extent with walkers, although never overcrowded. The land on which the rocks lie is private and the landowner has protested in the past about damage done to trees and footpaths and has threatened to bar access for visitors. The edge has many trees growing close to it although a good view of parts of the edge can be obtained from the A57 road 0.5 kilometres (0.3 mi) to the south. Sheep grazing fields stand immediately north of the edge and these are fenced off leaving room for only a narrow path quite close to the edge. The summit of the rocks gives good views of the lower of the Rivelin Dams.

== Rock climbing ==
The rock-climbing fraternity tend to refer to the rocks as Rivelin Edge. Many rock climbers are drawn to the area because of the fine obelisk of Rivelin Needle, a 20-metre (66 ft) free-standing gritstone pinnacle that stands in front of the main edge. There are no fewer than eight recognised routes up the needle, with “Croton Oil” graded at Hard Very Severe (HVS 5A) being regarded as a classic climb and one of the best routes on the eastern edges of the Peak District. The rocks in fact fall just inside the boundary of the national park. Additional attractions for the climber is that the rocks are south-facing and are often bathed in sunlight and warmer than some of the neighbouring climbing edges; the quality of the rock is also good, being extremely grippy.

The first recorded ascent of the Needle was in 1950 by Don Wooller using the 28-metre (92 ft) Spiral Route. Famous British climber Joe Brown climbed the Needle in 1954 by the Original Route. The main face of the rocks also has some excellent climbs, The Brush Off, Blizzard Ridge and Auto da Fe all being highly rated routes. Descent from the Needle is by abseiling from a metal chain at the top. The isolated western part of the crag is named White House Buttress after a house situated just below the edge, which formerly belonged to Arthur Balfour, 1st Baron Riverdale and has become a care home in recent years.

== Access ==
Rivelin Rocks are reached via a muddy public footpath that leaves the A57 road opposite the dam wall of the lower Rivelin Reservoir; the path goes through bracken and then enters a dense silver birch wood passing a sign that says you are entering a conservation area. The path forks in the wood; the left-hand branch leads gently uphill towards the rocks until the base of the crags are reached, then it is a short steep scramble up to the top of the rocks, finding an accessible gap in the crags. The view from the top give a good prospect of the lower Rivelin Reservoir. The area of the main edge just behind the needle has been quarried at some time in the past.
