= Long Causeway =

Medieval packhorse route

Coordinates: 53.356664°N 1.641153°W

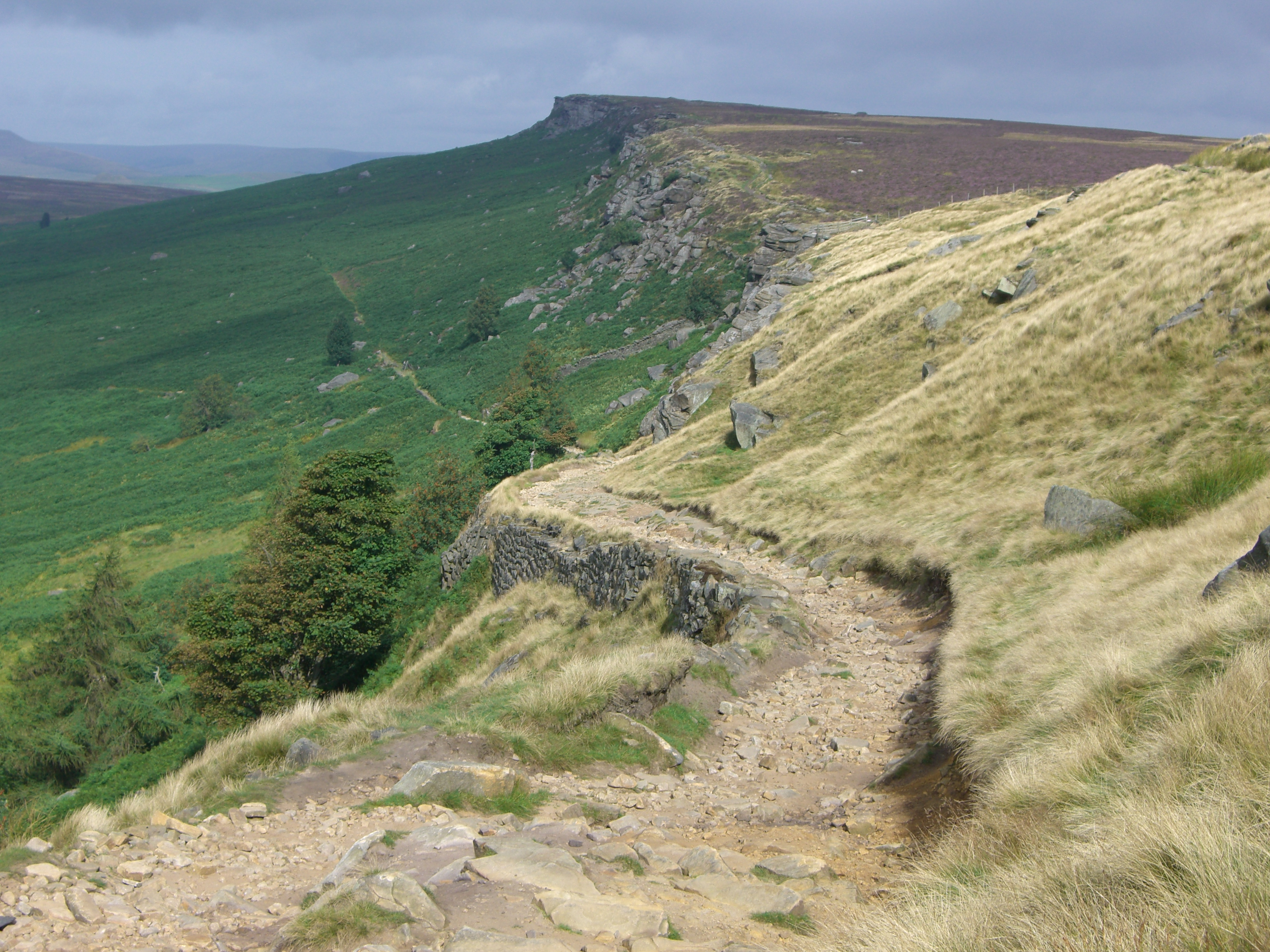
Long Causeway descends Stanage Edge

Long Causeway or Long Causey was a medieval packhorse route in England, which ran between Sheffield in South Yorkshire and Hathersage in Derbyshire. In the past the route was marked on maps as a Roman Road as it was believed it followed part of the route of Batham Gate between Templeborough and Buxton, although in recent years some scholars have cast doubt on this.

== Route ==
In medieval times Long Causeway was the middle of three routes that left Sheffield to the west. It started in the Portobello area of the town, beginning a seven-mile journey with more than 1,100 feet (340 m) of ascent to Stanedge Pole on the border between the manors of Sheffield and Hathersage. From Portobello the route continued by a series of rises and dips, climbing initially through Leavygreave and crossing the top of the Crookes valley and up Lydgate Lane (then called Hallam Gate) to reach what was then open moorland. The route then continued through present-day Crosspool and followed the route along what is now Sandygate Road and Redmires Road, crossing the location of the present-day Redmires Reservoirs before tackling the steepest ascent on the route up to Stanedge Pole.

From the pole the route began its drop down to Hathersage, going due west for half a mile before swinging sharply north-west to descend Stanage Edge at an angle through a less rocky part of the crags. The road down Stanage Edge was notoriously difficult and it is recorded that carters often asked passengers to disembark and “hung stones at the end of their carts, when going down Stannidge, it having great descent”. After negotiating the Stanage incline the road swung round almost 180 degrees, passing Dennis Knoll to enter Hathersage from the north.

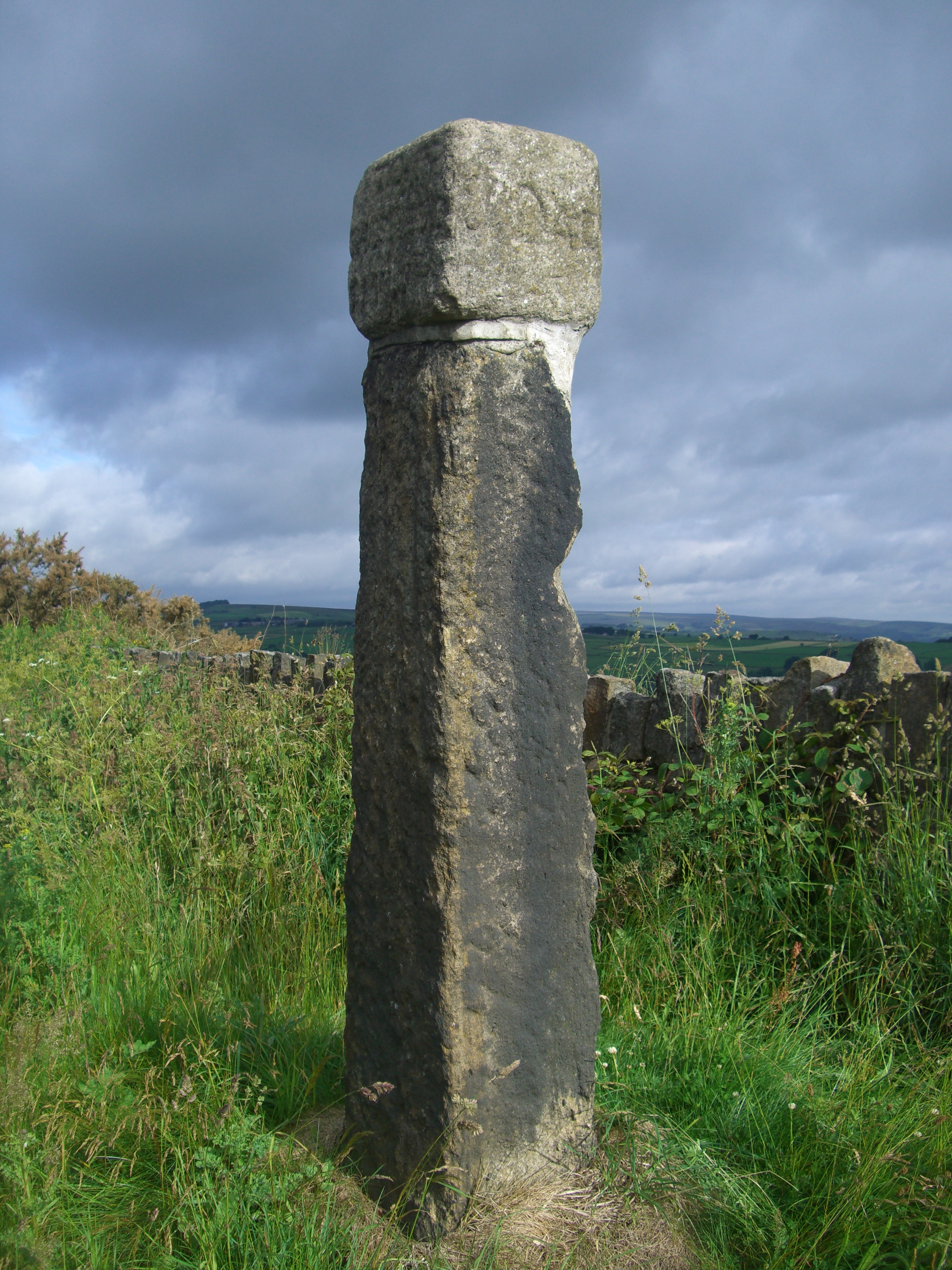
Barncliff Stoop

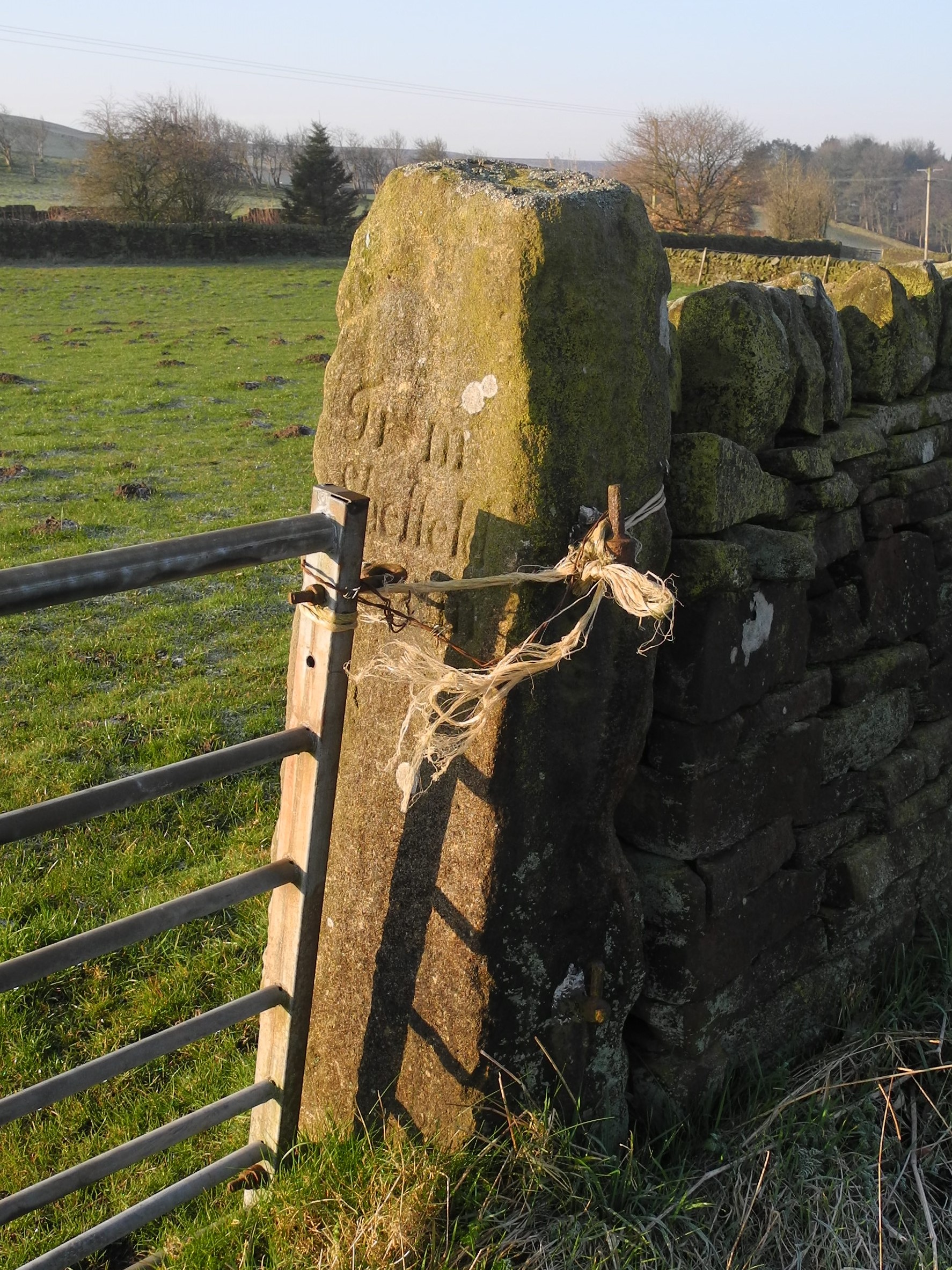
Long Causeway, milestone 5, now a field gatepost close to Wyming farm.

=== Roman deviation ===
Roman roads historian Ivan Donald Margary said that the Long Causeway had a slightly different route in Roman times. In his book Roman Roads In Britain, he says that evidence is now available that after the Redmires Reservoir the Roman road did not follow the medieval route to Stanedge Pole but kept to the line of the present-day track to Stanedge Lodge. The Roman road then descended Stanage Edge half a mile north west of the present route, on a narrow and steeper terrace. The existence of any Roman Road in the Stanage Edge area was challenged in 2016 by an interim report by University of Sheffield staff on excavations of a linear feature in the Sheephill Road, Ringinglow area.

== Milestones ==
Although Long Causeway was never a Turnpike road, milestones were added in the 1730s due to the high volume of traffic. This was an exceptional happening as even the law of 1758 required milestones only to be added on Turnpike roads. It is known that a milestone stood in the Sandygate area just past Crosspool and then a mile further on was the ancient marker of Barncliff Stoop on present day Redmires Road, which is still in place today. "Stoop" is a word of Scandinavian origin meaning a stone post and it stood near the "Barren Cliff", hence Barncliff. The age of the stoop is unknown but it predates the enclosure of the local moorland which took place in the 1500s. A milestone was added to the top of the stoop in 1738, this is now in Weston Park Museum, a replica now sits on top of the stoop which is now dedicated as a Grade II listed building.

After passing Barncliff Stoop the road dipped down to the valley of Black Brook from where it was possible to view the next milestone on the skyline, this stood outside the entrance to the former Lodge Moor Hospital and was still in place as recently as 1903 and it is believed that it disappeared altogether in the 1920s. The next milestones existed just east of Wyming Brook Farm, this became redundant at the end of the 18th century when the surrounding land was enclose and the Causeway was realigned. It survives as a farm gatepost, 175 yards east of the junction of Redmires Road and Soughley Lane. The final milestone before reaching Stanedge Pole stood on moorland next to a farm and a smithy and was submerged by the building of the Upper of the Redmires Reservoirs in 1854. This milestone has only been viewed in recent times when the reservoir has been drained for repair work or in drought conditions. This happened in 1875, 1911, 1974, 2007 and 2018, the stone is inscribed "From Sheffied 6". (Photograph on Picture Sheffield)

== Goods carried ==
The route was used extensively in the Middle Ages by traders bringing salt to Yorkshire from the Cheshire salt mines by packhorse. By the 18th century carts had replaced many of the packhorses and were transporting many goods including, oil, hardware good, barrels of tar, hogsheads of treacle, glue from Manchester, lead and small grinding stones. Traffic on Long Causeway started to decline around 1760 after the opening of an alternative route to the Hope Valley via Ringinglow.

== Remaining signs of the road ==
Between Redmires Reservoir and Dennis Knoll car park, just north of Hathersage (a distance of approximately four km), Long Causeway still exists as an unsurfaced track. This track is a BOAT (byway open to all traffic), however recently this has been subject to a traffic regulation order from the Peak District National Park, and vehicles have been banned. Small areas of the track are still paved in parts with the most extensive section being an 80-metre stretch just to the west of Stanage Pole. In early 2013 Derbyshire County Council carried out some resurfacing work between Stanage Edge and Dennis Knoll car park; this resulted in many of the large boulders being removed, leaving a smooth surface for horse riders and walkers. Many people have said this is out of character with the ancient track and the location inside a national Park.
