= Wyming Brook =

River in South Yorkshire, England

Coordinates: 53.3694°N 1.5959°W

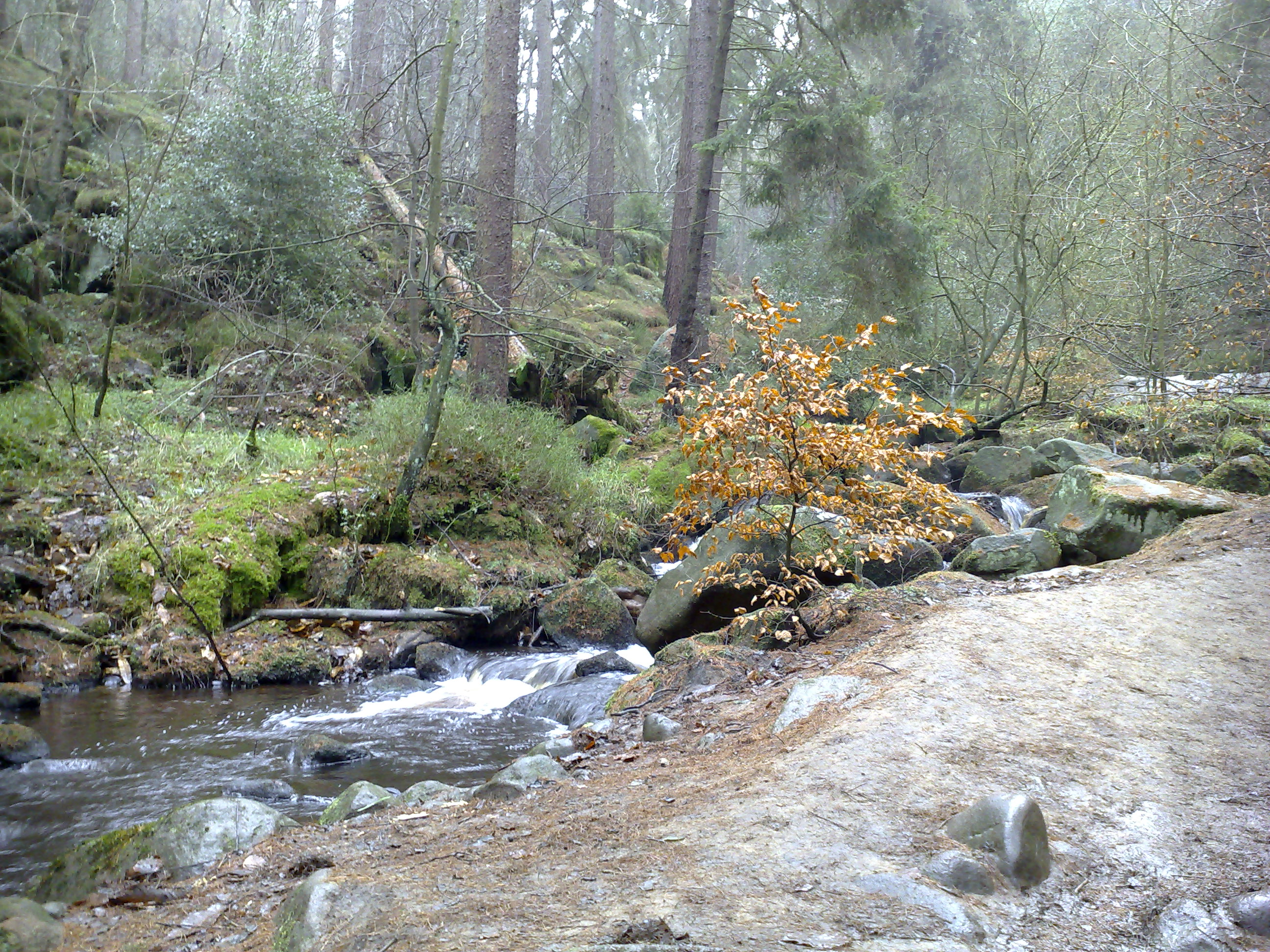
- In winter the river can be quite a loud 'babbling brook'.

Location
- Country: England
- County: South Yorkshire
- City: Sheffield

Physical characteristics
- Source: Redmires Reservoirs
- Mouth: Rivelin Dams
- Length: 0.6 miles (1 km)

The Wyming Brook is a river in the City of Sheffield, England. Its source is the Redmires Reservoirs near the Hallam Moors. It flows in a north-easterly direction for over 0.6 miles (1 km) down quite steep terrain into an underground chamber where it joins the Rivelin tunnel before it flows into the lower of the Rivelin Dams. The river flows almost its entire length within the Wyming Brook Nature Reserve, a Site of Special Scientific Interest which is managed by the Wildlife Trust for Sheffield and Rotherham.

== Geography ==
A steep footpath runs alongside the brook and a bridleway, Wyming Brook Drive, crosses the nature reserve from north to south. The footpath can be quite steep, with it and the brook falling over 100 m in a kilometre. The surrounds are wooded near the bottom and more open near the top, with views of the Rivelin Valley. Red cedar, eastern hemlock, Douglas fir, red pine, sitka, sweet chestnut, black alder, oak and rowan can be seen alongside the brook. Wildlife found around Wyming Brook includes moths such as the common lutestring and northern spinach and birds, the dipper and the crossbill. The Peak District Boundary Walk runs through the nature reserve.

== History ==
Historically the area was used exclusively by the nobility when it was part of the hunting and hawking grounds of Rivelin Chase. Above, and to the west of the watercourse on Ash Cabin Flat is an embanked stone circle, dating to the Bronze Age.

In 2023 larch trees at the nature reserve were found to be infected with a non-native fungus-like disease, Phytophthora ramorum. The Forestry Commission served a Statutory Plant Health Notice to Sheffield and Rotherham Wildlife Trust ordering it to remove infected trees. Chestnut trees, also susceptible to ramorum were also felled. In September 2023 the wildlife trust started a planned four month programme to cut down over 1,000 trees. In October 2023 campaigners, who said the changes would create 'a post-apocalyptic landscape', launched a petition urging Sheffield Council, the land-owner, to challenge the SPHN and end the felling of trees. Sheffield Council responded by stating, 'the council is under a legal duty to comply with this notice'. Yorkshire Water, which owns land adjacent to the nature reserve were also carrying out preventative measures to halt the spread of ramorum by felling trees. An area of close planted sitka spruce and douglas fir, planted in the 1950s and considered to be of little value to wildlife has also been cut down with the expectation that native broadleaf woodland will replace the felled trees. The footpaths, bridleway and car parks at the site were closed for the duration of the work. The area was re-opened to the public on 13 April 2024.
