= Stanedge Pole =

Ancient boundary marker

Coordinates: 53.3561°N 1.6306°W

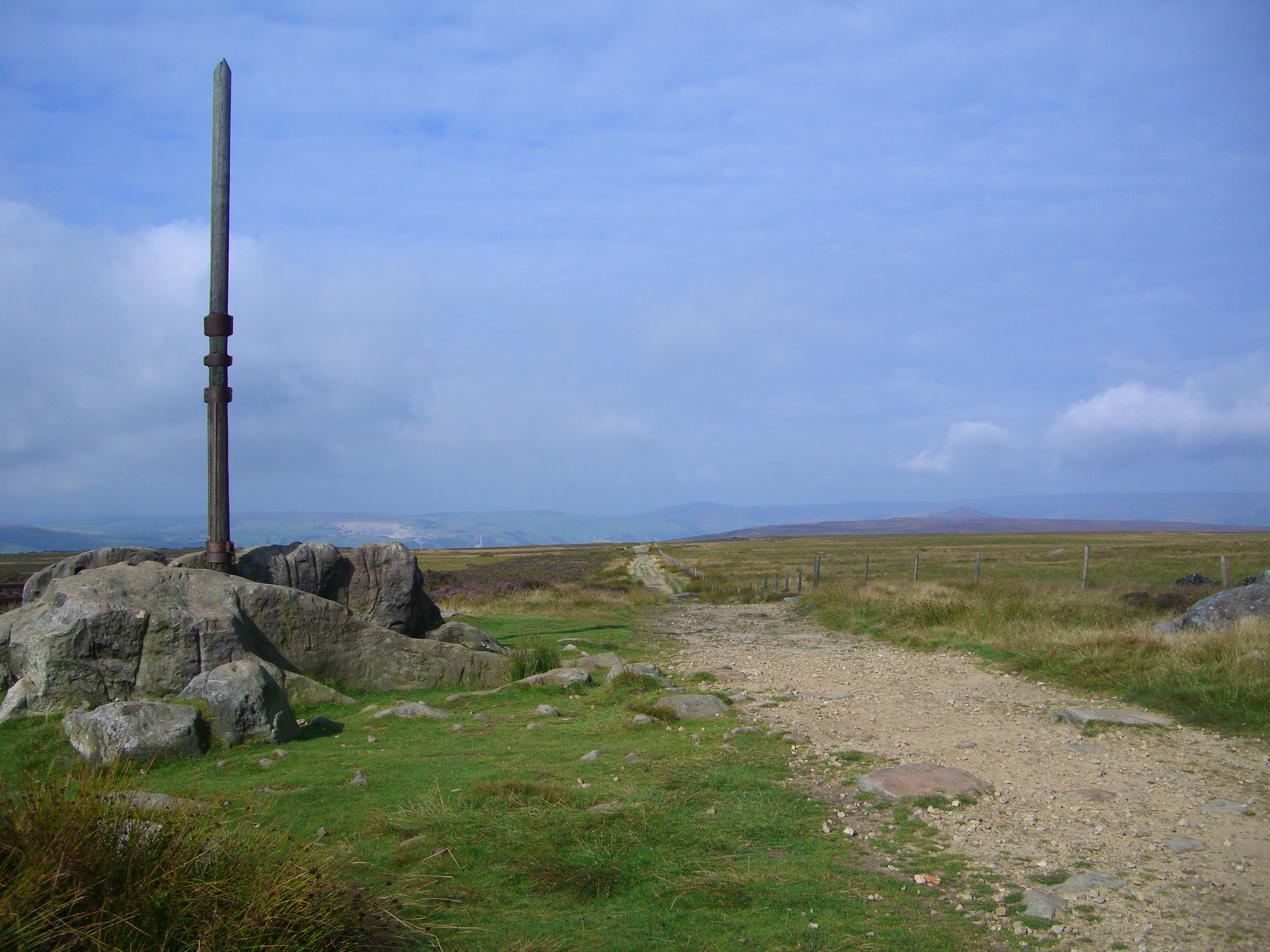
Old Stanedge Pole with Long Causeway to the right

Stanedge Pole also known as Stanage Pole (grid reference SK2468784429) is a landmark on Hallam Moors close to Stanage Edge in South Yorkshire, England. Standing at a height of 438 metres (1,437 feet), it marks the border between Derbyshire and South Yorkshire and can be seen for several miles around.

A pole has stood on the site since at least 1550. Many initials have been carved into the rock that supports it, and five can be identified as initials of the parish road surveyors who renewed the pole when needed. "T.C. 1550", "H.W. 1581", "T.M. 1631", "H.H. 1697" and "F.N. 1740" are the marks of the parish surveyors and the date the pole was renewed. The pole is a way marker on a medieval packhorse road known as the Long Causeway or Long Causey which runs west from Sheffield. It was used for centuries as a boundary marker between the parishes of Sheffield, Hathersage and Ecclesfield. Although it is widely believed the Long Causeway follows the line of a Roman road that ran from Templeborough Roman fort to the fort at Navio (Brough-on-Noe), archaeologists have cast doubt on this. There is some suggestion that the pole also marks the old boundary between Mercia and Northumberland.

The top part of the pole was removed on Friday, 27 February 2015. A spokesperson for the Peak District National Park explained that "the wood on the top half of the pole was rotten and therefore a health and safety risk to the public. We had no choice but to make the pole safe by cutting off the top part.”

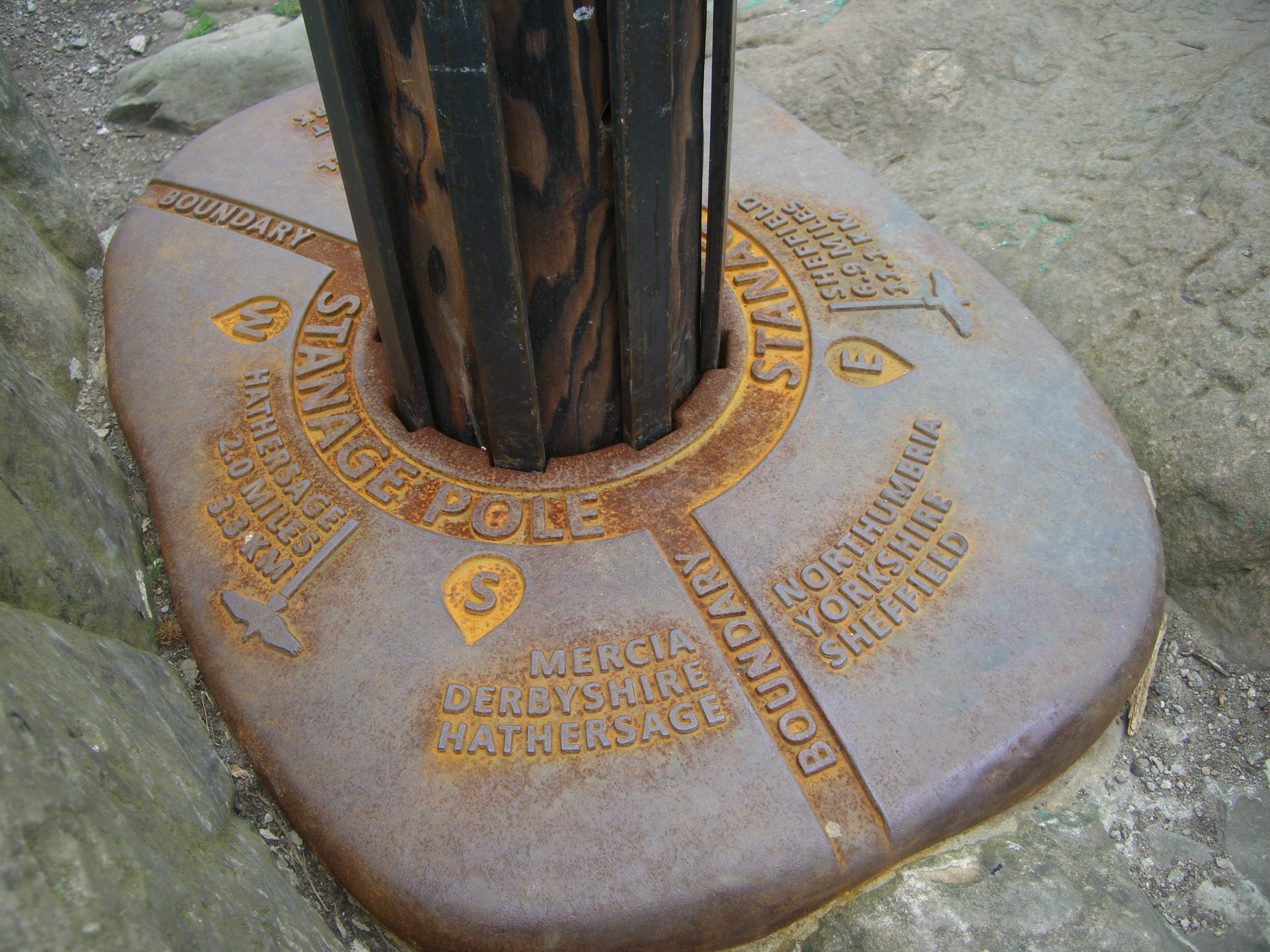
The base of the new pole.

On 17 April 2016 a group of people with an interest in the pole and surrounding environment, including the Peak District National Park Authority and the British Mountaineering Council, erected a new pole at the site to mark the 65th anniversary of the creation of the Peak District National Park. Support for the renewal also came from the Hope Cement Works, The Durham Foundry (Sheffield) Ltd, The Cutler's Company, Sheffield Clarion Ramblers and some public subscriptions. The new pole is formed from a locally felled larch tree, with a frame made by Hope Cement Works, and a base cast in Sheffield. The base is cast from ductile iron and has information cast into it (see photograph).
