= Rivelin Valley Park =

Park in Sheffield, England

Coordinates: 53.391493°N 1.517631°W

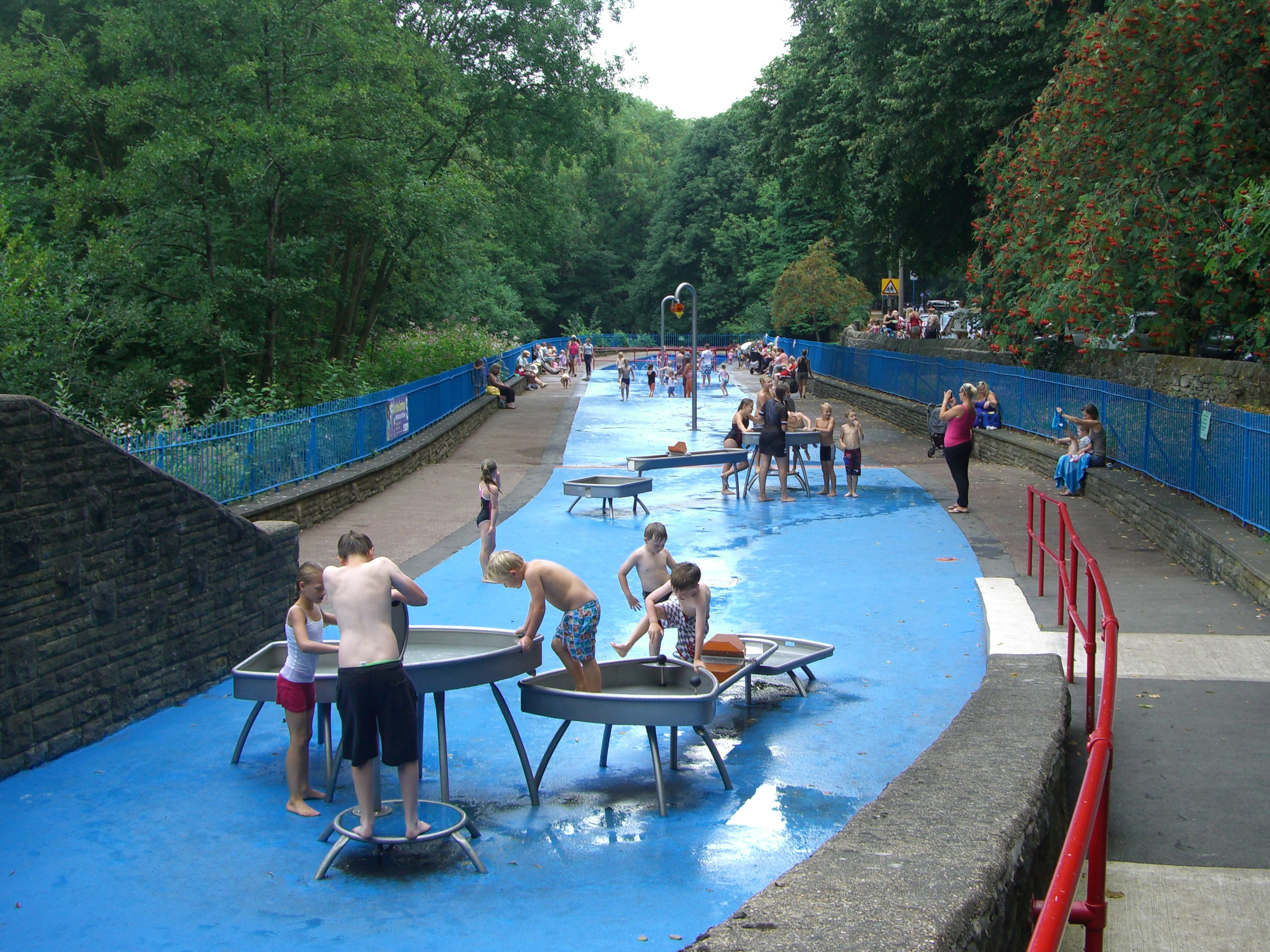
- The new splash pools, opened in July 2013
- Interactive map of Rivelin Valley Park
- Nearest city: Sheffield

Rivelin Valley Park is a public recreation area in the Rivelin Valley area of Sheffield, England. The facilities consist of a playground and a small water park as well as a café. The park is situated on the Rivelin Valley Nature Trail, which is maintained by volunteers from the Rivelin Valley Conservation Group.

== History ==
Recreation facilities in the area of Rivelin Valley Park date back to 1909 when the Corporation converted the New Dam into an open air swimming pool. The New Dam had been constructed in 1853 as a supplementary water supply to Spooner mill which made scythes and cutlery. The swimming pool was opened on 18 September 1909 for men and boys, although it is recorded that women were allowed to use the facility. The water in the pool was always very cold because of low sunlight due to it being set low in the valley, however 19,098 bathers used the pool in 1910. The pool closed in the 1930s when the large wooden hut used as changing facilities burned down.

New facilities were built for the park in the early 1950s on the site of the Spooner's wheel, which dated from the late 18th century. The mill buildings were demolished and the small reservoir filled in, and were replaced by the children's playground and café. At the same time paddling pools were constructed between Rivelin Valley Road and the River Rivelin. The river had always been used as an unofficial play area by children and the new pools which were constructed as part of the Festival of Britain celebrations were inspired by the success of the paddling pools at Millhouses Park. The construction of the pools called for the River Rivelin to be diverted by the use of a cofferdam and puddling. The pools were opened by the Lord Mayor Alderman T.W. Bridgland, J.P on 27 July 1951.

The paddling pools were completely revamped and renamed as the Rivelin Valley Splash in 2013 after consultation with the local population. The changes include a new water filter system, three large splash pads with anti-slip surfacing, a variety of waterplay equipment, such as jets, sprinklers, bucket drops and water tables and ramped access with handrails into the paddling pool. Some of the funding for the new facilities has come from the Aiming High for Disabled Children programme and this has ensured full disabled facilities. The new pools were opened on Saturday 13 July 2013. The playground and toilets were also upgraded in 2012 and 2013 respectively and the café continues to offer meals and refreshments on a daily basis.
