= Redmires Reservoirs =

Lake in South Yorkshire, England

- An almost empty Redmires Upper Reservoir

- Location within Sheffield
- Location: Sheffield, South Yorkshire
- Coordinates: 53.366°N 1.608°W
- Type: reservoir
- Basin countries: United Kingdom
- Surface area: 23 and 19 and 12 hectares (57 and 47 and 30 acres) (Upper, Middle, Lower)
- Max. depth: 15 and 14 and 14 m (49 and 46 and 46 ft) (Upper, Middle, Lower)
- Surface elevation: 352 m (1,155 ft)

The Redmires Reservoirs are a group of three reservoirs in Fulwood, Sheffield, South Yorkshire, England. They are fed from the Hallam Moors by various small streams including Fairthorn Clough. The three reservoirs are named Upper, Middle and Lower; they were authorised by the Sheffield Water Act 1830 (11 Geo. 4 & 1 Will. 4. c. lv) and were built between 1833 and 1854 to provide clean drinking water via an open water course which led to the Hadfield Dam situated in Crookes, following the devastating Sheffield cholera epidemic of 1832. The dams were built as part of the Sheffield Waterworks Company's continuing expansion to meet the ever growing population of Sheffield.

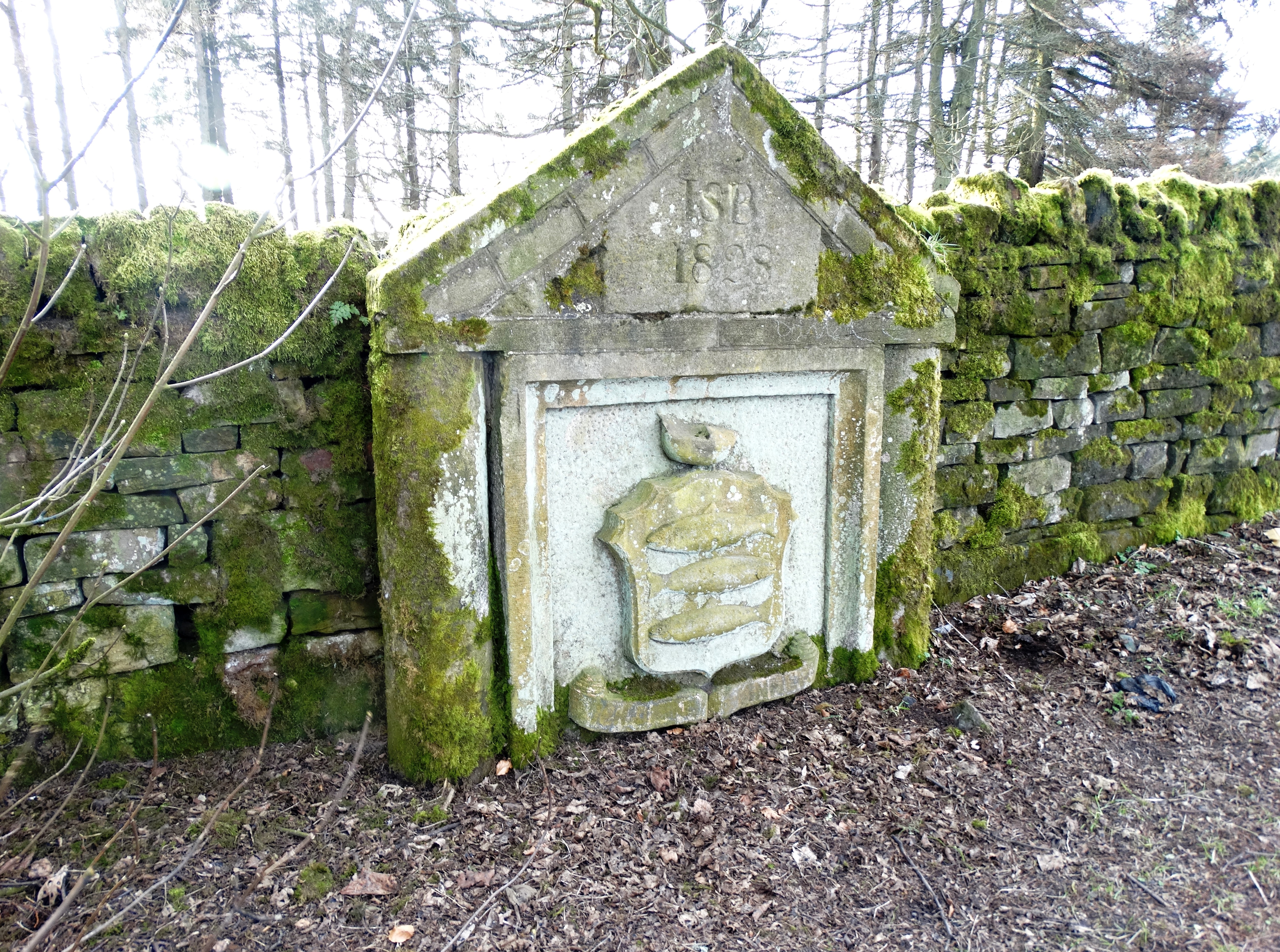
Bas-relief from the Grouse and Trout Inn

The area is popular with walkers and bird watchers. Adjacent to the Middle Reservoir is Hammond's Field Nature Reserve, which is managed by The Wildlife Trust for Sheffield and Rotherham. The nature reserve forms part of the South Pennine Moors Special Protected Area. A path, the Long Causeway leads from the Upper reservoir, onto the moors to Stanedge Pole and then onto Stanage Edge. This route was once thought to be a Roman road but is now thought to be a Medieval packhorse saltway, used to convey salt from Cheshire to Yorkshire. The Grouse and Trout Inn, opened in 1852, once stood close to Middle Reservoir. It closed in 1913 and was demolished in 1934. All that remains of the public house is a bas-relief from the facade.
