= Rivelin Valley artists =

Group of artists from Sheffield, England

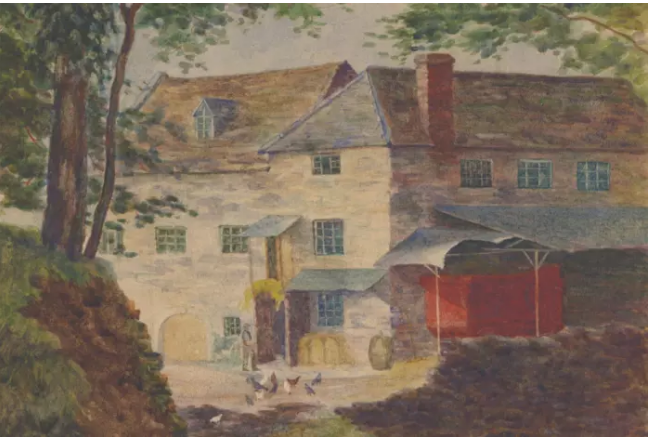
Ben Baines (1922), Rivelin Valley Corn Mill

The Rivelin Valley artists were a group of professional and amateur landscape artists in the early 1920s, based in the Rivelin Valley, Sheffield. The most prominent was Robert Scott-Temple. Others were William WE Goodrich, Ben Baines, Charles Edwin Dyson, Vernon Edwards and Charles Pigott.

Their work was shown and celebrated at Sheffield's Weston Park Gallery in July 2017.
