= 2004 FA Trophy final =

2004 FA Trophy Final
- Event: 2003–04 FA Trophy
Hednesford Town	Canvey Island
3	2
- Date: 23 May 2004
- Venue: Villa Park, Birmingham
- Man of the Match: Anthony Maguire (Hednesford Town)
- Referee: Mike Dean
- Attendance: 6,635

The 2003–04 FA Trophy is the 34th season of the FA Trophy, the Football Association's cup competition for teams at levels 5–8 of the English football league system. It was contested by Hednesford Town and Canvey Island on 23 May 2004 at Villa Park, Birmingham.

Hednesford Town won the match 3–2 to win the competition for the first time in their history.

== Road to Villa Park ==
Hednesford Town			Round	Canvey Island		
Shepshed Dynamo	0–1	Hednesford Town	Round 1^{[A]}		Bye	
Lancaster City	1–1	Hednesford Town	Round 2	Windsor & Eton	1–3	Canvey Island
Hednesford Town	1–0	Lancaster City	Replay	Windsor & Eton	1–3	Canvey Island
Hednesford Town	2–0	Gresley Rovers	Round 3	Canvey Island	6–0	Farnborough Town
Hednesford Town	1–1	Worthing	Round 4	Stafford Rangers	0–2	Canvey Island
Worthing	1–2	Hednesford Town	Replay	Stafford Rangers	0–2	Canvey Island
Hednesford Town	1–0	Dover Athletic	Round 5	Stalybridge Celtic	0–0	Canvey Island
Canvey Island	4–0	Stalybridge Celtic	Replay	Stalybridge Celtic	0–0	Canvey Island
Hednesford Town	3–1	Hornchurch	Round 6	Canvey Island	4–0	Maidenhead United
Aldershot Town	0–2	Hednesford Town	Semi Final 1st Leg	Telford United	0–0	Canvey Island
Hednesford Town	1–1	Aldershot Town	Semi Final 2nd Leg	Canvey Island	2–2 (won 4–2 on pens)	Telford United

== Match ==
23 May 2004
16:00 BST

Hednesford Town	3–2	Canvey Island
Maguire 27'; Hines 53'; Brindley 86'	Report	Boylan 46'; Brindley 47' (o.g.)

Villa Park, Birmingham
Attendance: 6,635
Referee: Mike Dean
