= 2003–04 FA Trophy =

FA Challenge Trophy

Tournament details
- Country: England; Wales
- Teams: 205

Final positions
- Champions: Hednesford Town
- Runners-up: Canvey Island

The 2003–04 FA Trophy was the thirty-second season of the FA Trophy.

== Preliminary round ==
=== Ties ===
Tie	Home team	Score	Away team
1	Arlesey Town	3–1	Fleet Town
2	Aveley	1–2	Burgess Hill Town
3	Bamber Bridge	4–3	Witton Albion
4	Bashley	2–2	Marlow
5	Bedworth United	0–3	Rugby United
6	Berkhamsted Town	0–3	Thame United
7	Bishop Auckland	4–2	Farsley Celtic
8	Bracknell Town	4–2	Croydon
9	Bromsgrove Rovers	3–1	Sutton Coldfield Town
10	Burnham	1–2	Stamford
11	Chesham United	0–2	Worthing
12	Chorley	1–2	Gresley Rovers
13	Cinderford Town	1–1	Yate Town
14	Corinthian-Casuals	0–2	King's Lynn
15	Dulwich Hamlet	2–0	Cheshunt
16	Dunstable Town	1–2	Lewes
17	Eastleigh	3–0	Great Wakering Rovers
18	Enfield	7–3	Epsom & Ewell
19	Fisher Athletic London	1–1	Horsham
20	Gateshead	1–0	Kendal Town
21	Gloucester City	2–0	Evesham United
22	Guiseley	7–1	Kidsgrove Athletic
23	Halesowen Town	4–3	Stourport Swifts
24	Hastings United	3–4	Yeading
25	Hemel Hempstead Town	3–2	Metropolitan Police
26	Ilkeston Town	1–2	Bridlington Town
27	Leatherhead	1–3	Wealdstone
28	Leyton	3–3	Molesey
29	Lincoln United	0–0	Workington
30	Mangotsfield United w/o-scr Atherstone United		
31	Matlock Town	2–0	Ossett Town
32	North Ferriby United	3–2	Hyde United
33	Oxford City	1–4	Folkestone Invicta
34	Prescot Cables	2–1	Belper Town
35	Rossendale United	1–0	Colwyn Bay
36	Salisbury City	0–1	Clevedon Town
37	Shepshed Dynamo	0–0	Solihull Borough
38	Staines Town	3–0	Barking & East Ham United
39	Stocksbridge Park Steels	2–1	Leek Town
40	Taunton Town	3–1	Corby Town
41	Team Bath	2–0	Banbury United
42	Tooting & Mitcham United	1–2	Sittingbourne
43	Uxbridge	3–3	Harlow Town
44	Waltham Forest	1–2	Boreham Wood
45	Whyteleafe	2–1	Egham Town
46	Windsor & Eton	2–1	Chatham Town
47	Wingate & Finchley	2–1	Walton & Hersham
48	Wivenhoe Town	3–1	Newport I O W

=== Replays ===
Tie	Home team	Score	Away team
4	Marlow	3–1	Bashley
13	Yate Town	1–3	Cinderford Town
19	Horsham	1–3	Fisher Athletic London
28	Molesey	3–4	Leyton
29	Workington	1–0	Lincoln United
37	Solihull Borough	2–1	Shepshed Dynamo
43	Harlow Town	0–1	Uxbridge

== 1st round ==
=== Ties ===
Tie	Home team	Score	Away team
1	Alfreton Town	0–0	Prescot Cables
2	Arlesey Town	1–1	Hampton & Richmond Borough
3	Ashton United	1–1	Lancaster City
4	Aylesbury United	1–1	Banstead Athletic
5	Barton Rovers	0–0	Ford United
6	Billericay Town	4–3	Tilbury
7	Boreham Wood	1–0	Bracknell Town
8	Braintree Town	0–3	Harrow Borough
9	Burgess Hill Town	2–0	Sittingbourne
10	Carshalton Athletic	3–1	Bromley
11	Clevedon Town	0–3	Taunton Town
12	Dartford	2–2	Ashford Town (Middlesex)
13	Dulwich Hamlet	1–1	Yeading
14	Eastbourne Borough	1–2	Welling United
15	Erith & Belvedere	1–2	Eastleigh
16	Folkestone Invicta	4–1	Hemel Hempstead Town
17	Frickley Athletic	5–1	Radcliffe Borough
18	Gateshead	1–2	Altrincham
19	Grays Athletic	2–2	Fisher Athletic London
20	Gresley Rovers	1–0	Matlock Town
21	Guiseley	2–0	Gainsborough Trinity
22	Heybridge Swifts	0–1	Histon
23	King's Lynn	3–1	Thame United
24	Kingstonian	2–0	Stamford
25	Lewes	4–2	Northwood
26	Leyton	1–5	Dorchester Town
27	Mangotsfield United	1–3	Bath City
28	Marine	1–0	Bamber Bridge
29	Moor Green	2–3	Cinderford Town
30	Redditch United	6–2	Cirencester Town
31	Rossendale United	2–0	Bridlington Town
32	Rothwell Town	1–1	Gloucester City
33	Rugby United	0–0	Hinckley United
34	Runcorn F C Halton	7–0	Bishop Auckland
35	Shepshed Dynamo	0–1	Hednesford Town
36	Slough Town	2–2	Bishop's Stortford
37	Staines Town	2–0	Croydon Athletic
38	Stocksbridge Park Steels	2–1	North Ferriby United
39	Swindon Supermarine	3–2	Grantham Town
40	Team Bath	0–0	Halesowen Town
41	Tonbridge Angels	1–3	Marlow
42	Uxbridge	0–1	Bognor Regis Town
43	Wakefield & Emley	1–2	Blyth Spartans
44	Wealdstone	5–0	East Thurrock United
45	Weston-super-Mare	1–1	Bromsgrove Rovers
46	Weymouth	5–2	Merthyr Tydfil
47	Whyteleafe	1–1	Ashford Town (Kent)
48	Windsor & Eton	2–2	Enfield
49	Wingate & Finchley	0–2	Hornchurch
50	Wivenhoe Town	0–0	Hitchin Town
51	Workington	0–3	Spennymoor United
52	Worthing	0–0	Cambridge City

=== Replays ===
Tie	Home team	Score	Away team
1	Prescot Cables	1–4	Alfreton Town
2	Hampton & Richmond Borough	0–2	Arlesey Town
3	Lancaster City	3–2	Ashton United
4	Banstead Athletic	0–1	Aylesbury United
5	Ford United	1–0	Barton Rovers
12	Ashford Town (Middlesex)	2–1	Dartford
13	Yeading	5–0	Dulwich Hamlet
19	Fisher Athletic London	0–3	Grays Athletic
32	Gloucester City	4–1	Rothwell Town
33	Hinckley United	3–2	Rugby United
36	Bishop's Stortford	2–1	Slough Town
40	Halesowen Town	3–2	Team Bath
45	Bromsgrove Rovers	0–3	Weston-super-Mare
47	Ashford Town (Kent)	1–2	Whyteleafe
48	Enfield	0–3	Windsor & Eton
50	Hitchin Town	4–2	Wivenhoe Town
52	Cambridge City	2–3	Worthing

== 2nd round ==
=== Ties ===
Tie	Home team	Score	Away team
1	Alfreton Town	1–1	Vauxhall Motors
2	Altrincham	1–0	Southport
3	Aylesbury United	2–2	Grays Athletic
4	Bath City	2–1	Gloucester City
5	Billericay Town	0–2	King's Lynn
6	Blyth Spartans	4–2	Stocksbridge Park Steels
7	Boreham Wood	1–2	Arlesey Town
8	Burgess Hill Town	1–2	Staines Town
9	Carshalton Athletic	2–2	Thurrock
10	Chippenham Town	1–1	Basingstoke Town
11	Cinderford Town	3–3	Lewes
12	Dorchester Town	3–0	Harrow Borough
13	Eastleigh	1–4	Histon
14	Ford United	4–1	Chelmsford City
15	Gresley Rovers	3–2	Hinckley United
16	Halesowen Town	1–3	Hayes
17	Harrogate Town	2–2	Barrow
18	Havant & Waterlooville	2–2	Folkestone Invicta
19	Hendon	1–1	Kettering Town
20	Hornchurch	1–0	Newport County
21	Hucknall Town	2–1	Nuneaton Borough
22	Kingstonian	0–2	Bishop's Stortford
23	Lancaster City	1–1	Hednesford Town
24	Marine	2–0	Worcester City
25	Marlow	3–0	Tiverton Town
26	Redditch United	0–3	Stalybridge Celtic
27	Rossendale United	0–0	Guiseley
28	Runcorn F C Halton	3–2	Frickley Athletic
29	St Albans City	0–0	Crawley Town
30	Stafford Rangers	2–1	Spennymoor United
31	Sutton United	2–0	Bedford Town
32	Swindon Supermarine	3–3	Maidenhead United
33	Taunton Town	3–3	Yeading
34	Wealdstone	1–0	Hitchin Town
35	Welling United	0–1	Dover Athletic
36	Weston-super-Mare	1–0	Bognor Regis Town
37	Weymouth	3–3	Ashford Town (Middlesex)
38	Whitby Town	1–1	Bradford Park Avenue
39	Whyteleafe	0–4	Worthing
40	Windsor & Eton	1–3	Canvey Island
41	Worksop Town	1–0	Droylsden

=== Replays ===
Tie	Home team	Score	Away team
1	Vauxhall Motors	2–4	Alfreton Town
3	Grays Athletic	0–1	Aylesbury United
9	Thurrock	1–0	Carshalton Athletic
10	Basingstoke Town	1–0	Chippenham Town
11	Lewes	4–3	Cinderford Town
17	Barrow	4–2	Harrogate Town
18	Folkestone Invicta	1–0	Havant & Waterlooville
19	Kettering Town	2–2	Hendon
	(Kettering won 5–4 on penalties)		
23	Hednesford Town	1–0	Lancaster City
27	Guiseley	2–0	Rossendale United
29	Crawley Town	4–1	St Albans City
32	Maidenhead United	2–1	Swindon Supermarine
33	Yeading	1–3	Taunton Town
37	Ashford Town (Middlesex)	1–3	Weymouth
38	Bradford Park Avenue	1–0	Whitby Town

== 3rd round ==
Burscough as title holders and teams from Football Conference entered in this round

=== Ties ===
Tie	Home team	Score	Away team
1	Altrincham	2–1	Runcorn F C Halton
2	Barnet	3–2	Dover Athletic
	(Barnet removed, ineligible player)		
3	Bishop's Stortford	2–4	Aldershot Town
4	Blyth Spartans	1–0	Barrow
5	Burscough	0–1	Tamworth
6	Burton Albion	4–2	Accrington Stanley
7	Canvey Island	6–0	Farnborough Town
8	Chester City	1–2	Halifax Town
9	Dagenham & Redbridge	0–0	Crawley Town
10	Dorchester Town	2–2	Margate
11	Exeter City	3–2	Hereford United
12	Folkestone Invicta	1–3	Stevenage Borough
13	Forest Green Rovers	4–0	Sutton United
14	Gravesend & Northfleet	2–2	Weston-super-Mare
15	Guiseley	0–2	Worksop Town
16	Hayes	2–2	Arlesey Town
17	Hednesford Town	2–0	Gresley Rovers
18	Histon	1–3	Maidenhead United
19	Hornchurch	2–0	Aylesbury United
20	Hucknall Town	1–0	Bradford Park Avenue
21	Kettering Town	0–0	Woking
22	King's Lynn	3–1	Basingstoke Town
23	Leigh R M I	1–1	Stalybridge Celtic
	(Leigh removed, ineligible player)		
24	Lewes	5–8	Weymouth
25	Marine	1–0	Northwich Victoria
26	Marlow	3–1	Ford United
27	Scarborough	1–2	Stafford Rangers
28	Shrewsbury Town	2–0	Morecambe
29	Staines Town	1–0	Bath City
30	Telford United	2–0	Alfreton Town
31	Wealdstone	3–2	Thurrock
32	Worthing	3–0	Taunton Town

=== Replays ===
Tie	Home team	Score	Away team
9	Crawley Town	1–2	Dagenham & Redbridge
10	Margate	2–0	Dorchester Town
14	Weston-super-Mare	1–0	Gravesend & Northfleet
16	Arlesey Town	1–1	Hayes
	(Arlesey Town won 4–3 on penalties)		
21	Woking	2–3	Kettering Town

== 4th round ==
=== Ties ===
Tie	Home team	Score	Away team
1	Blyth Spartans	1–3	Aldershot Town
2	Burton Albion	1–1	Kettering Town
3	Dagenham & Redbridge	3–3	Arlesey Town
4	Forest Green Rovers	3–3	Dover Athletic
5	Halifax Town	1–1	Staines Town
6	Hednesford Town	1–1	Worthing
7	Hornchurch	1–0	Stevenage Borough
8	King's Lynn	0–3	Exeter City
9	Maidenhead United	5–1	Wealdstone
10	Margate	2–0	Worksop Town
11	Marlow	0–4	Tamworth
12	Shrewsbury Town	2–1	Hucknall Town
13	Stafford Rangers	0–2	Canvey Island
14	Stalybridge Celtic	1–1	Marine
15	Telford United	4–2	Weston-super-Mare
16	Weymouth	0–2	Altrincham

=== Replays ===
Tie	Home team	Score	Away team
2	Kettering Town	1–2	Burton Albion
3	Arlesey Town	4–2	Dagenham & Redbridge
4	Dover Athletic	2–1	Forest Green Rovers
5	Staines Town	2–3	Halifax Town
6	Worthing	1–2	Hednesford Town
14	Marine	0–1	Stalybridge Celtic

== 5th round ==
=== Ties ===
Tie	Home team	Score	Away team
1	Aldershot Town	1–1	Tamworth
2	Altrincham	0–1	Shrewsbury Town
3	Exeter City	3–0	Arlesey Town
4	Halifax Town	0–2	Maidenhead United
5	Hednesford Town	1–0	Dover Athletic
6	Hornchurch	2–1	Burton Albion
7	Stalybridge Celtic	0–0	Canvey Island
8	Telford United	3–0	Margate

=== Replays ===
Tie	Home team	Score	Away team
1	Tamworth	0–2	Aldershot Town
7	Canvey Island	4–0	Stalybridge Celtic

== Quarter finals ==
=== Ties ===
Tie	Home team	Score	Away team
1	Aldershot Town	2–1	Exeter City
2	Canvey Island	4–0	Maidenhead United
3	Hednesford Town	3–1	Hornchurch
4	Shrewsbury Town	1–1	Telford United

=== Replay ===
Tie	Home team	Score	Away team
3	Telford United	2–1	Shrewsbury Town

== Semi finals ==
=== First leg ===
Tie	Home team	Score	Away team
1	Aldershot Town	0–2	Hednesford Town
2	Telford United	0–0	Canvey Island

=== Second leg ===
Tie	Home team	Score	Away team	Aggregate
1	Hednesford Town	1–1	Aldershot Town	3–1
2	Canvey Island	1–1	Telford United	1–1
	(Canvey Island won 4–2 on penalties)			

== Final ==
23 May 2004
16:00 BST

Hednesford Town	3–2	Canvey Island
Maguire 27'; Hines 53'; Brindley 86'	Report	Boylan 46'; Brindley 47' (o.g.)

Villa Park, Birmingham
Attendance: 6,635
Referee: Mike Dean
