= Stuart Ford =

Stuart Ford may refer to:

- Stuart Ford (footballer)
- Stuart Ford (film producer)
- Stuart Ford (law professor)
