= Firth Park Academy =

Lift Firth Park

Location
- Fircroft Avenue; Sheffield, South Yorkshire, S5 0SD; England; 53.42579°N 1.44548°W

Information
- Type: Academy
- Department for Education URN: 139334 Tables
- Ofsted: Reports
- Gender: Coeducational
- Age: 11 to 16
- Enrolment: 1,019
- Colours: Blue (light and dark), white
- Publication: In Touch
- Website: www.firthparkacademy.org

Lift Firth Park is a coeducational secondary school with academy status, in the Shiregreen area of Sheffield, England.

It is partnered with Longley Park Sixth Form, HBH Academy Trust, Beck Primary School, Hucklow Primary School and others.

== History ==
In 1920 Firth Park Secondary School opened at the Brushes Building at the junction of Barnsley Road & Horninglow Road. It became Firth Park Grammar School in 1937. The uniform of the grammar school was a red/maroon blazer with a matching red/maroon & green diagonal striped tie. As the uniform also included in the earlier years a red or maroon cap, the pupils were called Red Caps. Old pupils of the school are known as Old Firparnians. In 1969/70, following the Labour Government's national shake up of secondary education, the school merged with Hatfield House Secondary School, and became a comprehensive as Firth Park School. It operated from the original buildings of the former schools (Brushes & North buildings).

In 2003, following a period of closure and several arson incidents, the Brushes building was demolished. In 2004, the Longley Park Sixth Form College was opened on the site of Firth Park Grammar School. Firth Park School, now operating on the modernised site of the Hatfield House Secondary School on Fircroft Avenue two miles from the original Grammar School site, gained specialist status as an Arts College and was renamed Firth Park Community Arts College. The school converted to academy status on 1 August 2013 and was renamed Firth Park Academy. The school is now sponsored by Lift Schools.

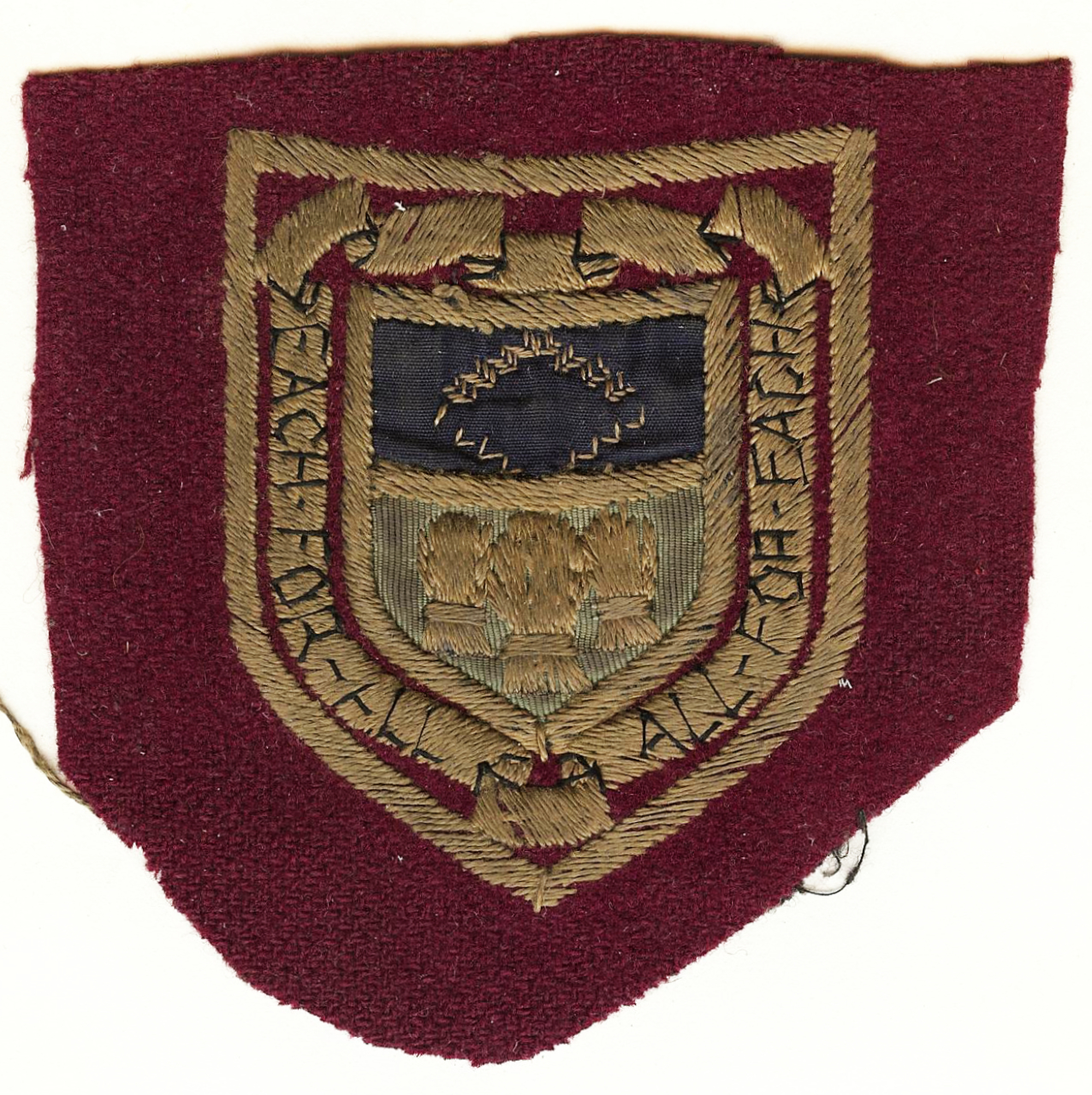
Firth Park Grammar School Blazer Badge, pre-war. The motto reads "Each for All - All for Each"

== Academic performance ==
Currently, the school achieves average GCSEs grades; a large number of students entering the school have average attainment level of around 85%. The sixth form college for Firth Park Academy is Longley Park Sixth Form.

== Television appearance ==
From 2016 to 2021, Firth Park Academy appeared in the CBBC show, Our School. This showed the experiences of pupils joining Firth Park Academy.

== Notable former pupils ==
- Stuart Ford, goalkeeper
- Richard Hawley, musician with the Longpigs
- Mark Rhodes, footballer with Rotherham United

=== Firth Park Grammar School ===
- Robert Battersby, Conservative MEP from 1979–89 for Humberside
- Gerald Brooke, arrested for smuggling anti-Soviet leaflets in USSR in 1965
- Howard Johnson, footballer
- Gordon Linacre, Chairman from 1983–90 of Yorkshire Post Newspapers
- Lincoln Ralphs, Chief Education Officer from 1950–74 of Norfolk
- Roy Shaw, Secretary General from 1975–83 of the Arts Council of Great Britain
- Paul Truswell, Labour MP from 1997–2010 for Pudsey
- Mothin Ali, Green Party politician

=== Firth Park Secondary School ===
- John Bridge, the first person to be awarded a bar to the George Medal was a teacher at the school before and after the Second World War
- Gordon Hobson, footballer
