= Howard Johnson (footballer) =

English footballer

Personal information
- Full name: Howard Johnson
- Date of birth: 17 July 1925
- Place of birth: Sheffield, England
- Date of death: 15 June 2015 (aged 89)
- Place of death: Lincolnshire, England
- Height: 5 ft 10 in (1.78 m)
- Position: Defender

Senior career*
Years	Team	Apps	(Gls)
- Sheffield Inland Revenue
- Norton Woodseats
1951–1957	Sheffield United	92	(0)
1957–1959	York City	28	(0)
1959–1962	Denaby United		
- * Club domestic league appearances and goals

Howard Johnson (17 July 1925 – 15 June 2015) was an English footballer who played primarily as a defender. Born in Sheffield, he played in the Football League for Sheffield United and York City.

== Early life ==
Born in the Pitsmoor area of Sheffield, Johnson attended the Firth Park Grammar School and later served in the navy. On returning to civilian life, Johnson trained to be an accountant and worked as a finance clerk while playing football part-time for Norton Woodseats.

== Playing career ==
Johnson was signed on a part-time contract by Sheffield United in March 1951, with United donating £200 to his amateur club. After making his league debut against Brentford a few days later, Johnson made occasional first-team appearances for his first two seasons. Johnson began make regular appearances during the 1953–54 promotion season but was soon relegated to bit-part status once more as he had to compete with Joe Shaw in central defence. Johnson remained with the Blades until the summer of 1957, and despite having played most of his career as a defender, his final four games for the club were as a makeshift centre forward. Despite never really holding down a first team place with Sheffield United, Johnson left the club having made over 100 appearances, scoring one goal.

After leaving Sheffield United, Johnson joined York City where he remained for a further two seasons before joining non-league Denaby United in 1959.

== Later life ==
On retiring from football, Johnson returned to his former career as an accounts clerk and later became a computer systems analyst.

Johnson died on 15 June 2015. He was 89.
