= Roy Shaw (arts administrator) =

English arts administrator

Sir Roy Shaw (8 July 1918 – 15 May 2012) was a British educationalist and public servant. Originally employed in adult education, to which he remained dedicated in later life, he was Secretary-General of the Arts Council of Great Britain from 1975 to 1983.

== Early life ==
Roy Shaw was born on 8 July 1918 in Sheffield, England, the only child of Frederick Shaw, a steelworker, and Elsie Shaw, née Ogden, who had been a 'buffer girl' in the steelworks during the First World War. His father left the family when his son was four and died not long afterwards, and Shaw was brought up for a time by his grandparents (his grandfather was a miner in Shirebrook, Derbyshire), which he revisited in the Central Television programme on his life (1983).

Shaw attended Firth Park Grammar School, but the later part of his schooldays were affected by the onset of Crohn's disease, and he was unable to gain his Higher School Certificate. He worked first in a butcher's shop and then, after two years at the Sheffield Telegraph, Shaw worked for Sheffield Library, having by then declared himself a conscientious objector at the registration for the Military Training Act 1939 on 3 June 1939, three months before the Second World War. Shaw gained a place at the Quaker college at Woodbrooke, Birmingham, for a pre-university course in 1941 and later read German and Philosophy at Manchester University, from which he graduated in 1946.

While at Manchester University he was an editor of the short-lived journal, Humanitas, along with Herbert McCabe, who later became a Dominican priest. In 1946, Shaw married Gwenyth Baron. They had seven children, including the sociologist Martin Shaw and journalist Phil Shaw.

== Career ==
Also in 1946, Shaw was appointed a tutor for the Workers' Educational Association in the East Riding of Yorkshire, based at Driffield. In 1947, he became a lecturer in the Department of Extra-Mural Studies at the University of Leeds, and in 1958 was appointed Director of the Leeds University Adult Education Centre in Bradford.

In 1962 Shaw was appointed head of Adult Education at the University of Keele, and was made a Professor in 1967. WhIle at Keele he became a member of the Boards of Governors of the BBC and of the British Film Institute, and was involved in the foundation of the Open University.

In 1975 he was appointed Secretary-General of the Arts Council of Great Britain, where he remained until retirement in 1983. While at the Council he particularly promoted Arts Education, in line with his lifelong commitment to expanding access to the Arts. Shaw rejected a common assumption about arts funding:

"The arts do reach only a minority of the population, particularly the serious arts which we fund, but I believe you can extend the reach beyond the middle class... by education. What distinguishes the bourgeoisie is not a special gift from God but the fact that they've had an education and the opportunity to enjoy the arts."

Despite this, in the later half of his tenure Shaw presided over the council during one of its most difficult periods. After the election of the Margaret Thatcher's Conservative government in 1979, the council was forced to make major cuts to the budgets of the arts organisations it financially supported.

== Later years and religious history ==
In retirement, Shaw wrote The Arts and the People and his critical account of The Spread of Sponsorship, a subject on which he also wrote in The Political Quarterly.

Shaw was a prolific lecturer, published examples including "Culture and Equality: The Role of Adult Education", his inaugural lecture at Keele; "The Relevance of Ruskin" (The Ruskin Lecture, 1987); and "Who Should Pay for the Arts?" (The Harold Dellar Lecture, 1987).

In his seventies, Shaw was for nearly a decade the theatre critic of The Tablet. He remained concerned with political issues, for example visiting Israel in 1994 to press for the release of the nuclear whistle-blower Mordechai Vanunu. In 2006, at the age of 88, Shaw chaired the Celebrating Age festival in Brighton and Hove.

Shaw converted to Catholicism in 1955, but left the Church in the late 1960s returned in the 1970s, although he eventually described himself as an agnostic in his last decade. He was knighted in 1979, the last Secretary-General so to be honoured before the Council itself was broken into separate councils for each nation in the UK during 1991. In his final year he wrote a partial draft of an autobiography, which was completed after his death by his widow, Gwen Shaw, and published privately by her in 2012 under the title 'Catching the Rope: A Memoir of the Early Years 1918-1946'.
