= Lincoln Ralphs =

British education officer and student activist

Sir Lincoln Ralphs

President of the National Union of Students
- In office 1934–1936
- Preceded by: Charles G Gilmore
- Succeeded by: F Fraser Milne

Personal details
- Born: 17 February 1909 Wellington, Shropshire
- Died: 16 October 1978 (aged 69) Norwich, Norfolk
- Spouse: Enid Mary Cowlin (m. 1938)

Sir Frederick Lincoln Ralphs (17 February 1909 –16 October 1978) was a British education officer and student activist.

Ralphs was born in Wellington, Shropshire, to a Methodist family who had been victimised for their involvement with trade unions. They moved to Sheffield while Ralphs was young, and he attended Firth Park Grammar School and the University of Sheffield, where he graduated in both science and law. While there, he became involved with the National Union of Students (NUS) and served as President of the NUS from 1934 to 1936. From 1937 to 1938, he was also President of the International Confederation of Students.

In 1938, Ralphs married Enid Mary Cowlin, vice-president of the NUS, who later became a lecturer and held many prominent offices in Norfolk. The couple moved to Norwich in 1946. Appointed as Deputy Education Officer for Norfolk, one of his first jobs was writing a document calling for the creation of a university in the county; this was eventually founded as the University of East Anglia.

In 1950, Ralphs was promoted to become Chief Education Officer for the county, and he served in the position until 1974. In this role, he opposed the creation of the Open University but was active in the Schools Broadcasting Council, and in 1969, he also became chairman of the Further Education Advisory Council. He was the key figure behind the establishment of Wymondham College in 1951.

A lay preacher, Ralphs also served as President of the National Sunday School Union.

In the 1973 Birthday Honours, Ralphs was made a Knight Bachelor.

Ralphs died on 16 October 1978 at the Norfolk and Norwich University Hospital, aged 69.
