= Chris Brindley =

English footballer (born 1969)

Personal information
- Full name: Christopher Brindley
- Date of birth: 5 July 1969 (age 57)
- Place of birth: Stoke-on-Trent, England
- Height: 6 ft 1 in (1.85 m)
- Position: Defender

Team information
- Current team: Stafford Rangers

Senior career*
Years	Team	Apps	(Gls)
1985–1986	Hednesford Town		(0)
1986–1988	Wolverhampton Wanderers	7	(0)
1988–1992	Telford United		(0)
1992–1998	Kidderminster Harriers		(0)
1998–2000	Hednesford Town	37	(3)
2000–2002	Stafford Rangers	71	(3)
2002–2006	Hednesford Town		(0)
2006	Gresley Rovers		(0)
2006–2007	Halesowen Town		(0)
2007	Stourport Swifts		(0)
2007–2008	Rushall Olympic		(0)

Managerial career
- 2003–2005: Hednesford Town (assistant)
- 2005–2006: Hednesford Town
- 2006–2007: Halesowen Town (assistant)
- 2007: Stourport Swifts (coach)
- 2007–2008: Rushall Olympic (assistant)
- 2008: Stafford Rangers (assistant)
- 2008–2010: Stafford Rangers
- 2011–: Chasetown
- * Club domestic league appearances and goals

Chris Brindley (born 5 July 1969) is an English former footballer who played as a defender.

== Career ==
Brindley started out with Chasetown before moving to Hednesford Town in the 1980s, before getting his big break with a move to Wolverhampton Wanderers in 1985. After only seven appearances at Molineux in two seasons, he was sold to Telford United, where he won the FA Trophy at Wembley at the end of the 1988–1989 season. In August 1992, a £20,000 move to Kidderminster Harriers proved the best move of his career, as he won the Football Conference title and played in the 1995 FA Trophy Final against Woking, being awarded the Man of the Match, despite finishing the game with a broken arm before being substituted.

He moved back to Hednesford in an exchange deal with Nigel Niblett in early 1998, and played over 100 times for the Pitmen before being released, signing for local rivals Stafford Rangers in June 2000. He returned for a third spell in June 2002, and worked his way up to assistant manager, scoring the winner in the 2004 FA Trophy final. He was appointed manager in June 2004, and led the club to promotion via the Southern Football League play-off in May 2005.

He left Hednesford in December 2005 after agreeing with the board to leave the post due to poor results. From there he teamed up with Northern Premier League side Gresley Rovers, before joining Halesowen Town in May 2006 as player and assistant manager. In December 2006, he left to join Stourport Swifts after former Hednesford players Martin O'Connor and Graham Hyde took over the reins at the Yeltz. He linked up again with former Halesowen manager Paul Holleran at Rushall Olympic, again as player-assistant manager, in January 2007. After assisting Holleran to the end of the 2007–08 season, Brindley made the step up to Conference North level once again, joining old foes Stafford Rangers once again as assistant manager to new Rangers boss – and former Wolves teammate – Steve Bull. This move also effectively moved the man into retirement after appearing numerous times for the Pics during 2007–2008.

Money troubles hit Marston Road during the opening months of the 2008–09 season, with Bull amongst a number of people released as Rangers desperately looked to balance the books. Brindley took over as manager in December 2008, and with a threadbare squad, held on to their Conference North status for the 2009–10 season. In September 2010 Brindley resigned as manager of Stafford Rangers. He gave a reason for his departure "The reason I leave Rangers is simply because there's no Chairman, no money & most the players are youth. Also having the fans on your back doesn't help even though there's no money at all".

Brindley has since been appointed Chasetown manager after Charlie Blakemore left. He also took up a board of directors post following a game against Stafford Rangers.
