= Gordon Linacre =

British journalist and RAF officer (1920–2015)

Sir Gordon Linacre CBE AFC DFM
- Born: John Gordon Seymour Linacre; 23 September 1920; Sheffield, Yorkshire, England
- Died: 5 February 2015 (aged 94)
- Military career
- Allegiance: United Kingdom
- Branch: Royal Air Force
- Service years: 1939–1946
- Rank: Squadron leader
- Service number: 986629 (airman); 112188 (officer)
- Conflicts: World War II
- Awards: Distinguished Flying Medal (1941); Mentioned in Despatches (1944); Air Force Cross (1945); Commander of the Order of the British Empire (1979); Knight Bachelor (1986)

Sir John Gordon Seymour Linacre, CBE, AFC, DFM (23 September 1920 – 5 February 2015) was a British press baron, journalist, and decorated Royal Air Force officer.

== Early life ==
Linacre was born on 23 September 1920 in Sheffield, Yorkshire, England. His father was a steelworks foreman. He was educated at Firth Park Grammar School, a grammar school in Sheffield. He is credited with starting its school newspaper.

== Career ==
=== Military service ===
With the outbreak of World War II in 1939, Linacre joined the Royal Air Force as an airman. He trained as a bomber pilot and was promoted to the non-commissioned rank of sergeant. He was involved in raids over Nazi occupied Europe. As a member of No. 83 Squadron RAF, he bombed targets in Berlin, Essen, Kiel and Mannheim.

On 3 November 1941, he granted an emergency commission in the Royal Air Force Volunteer Reserve as a pilot officer on probation. On 1 October 1942, he was promoted to flying officer on probation (war substantive). When he was mentioned in despatches in June 1944, he held the acting rank of squadron leader.

At the end of the war, he was offered a regular commission in the Royal Air Force and encouraged to remain in the military, but he turned it down. Therefore, in 1946 he was demobilised and returned to civilian life.

=== Journalism career ===
Linacre first expressed an interest in becoming a journalist at the age of seven. Ten years later, at the age of 17, he joined The Sheffield Independent. He left the newspaper in 1939 to serve in the Royal Air Force during World War II.

Though he was offered a permanent commission to continue serving with the RAF after the war, he decided to return to journalism. His first job was as a sub-editor or the Sunday Graphic. He then became assistant editor of The Journal and the Evening Chronicle, both Newcastle based newspapers. In 1958, he became editor of the Sheffield Star.

In 1963, he moved from direct involvement in newspaper production, as a journalist or editor, to a back room job as executive director of Thomson Regional Newspapers. He was head-hunted by Yorkshire Conservative Newspapers, joining the publisher as managing director in April 1965. In 1969, Yorkshire Conservative Newspapers merged into United Newspapers. Linacre fought for The Yorkshire Post to maintain its independent under its new publisher. This was agreed to and he was also offered a position as a member of its board of directors of United Newspapers. He was chief executive of United Newspapers from 1981 to 1988. In 1983, he was appointed chairman of the Yorkshire Post Newspapers and deputy chairman of United Newspapers. In 1985, he negotiated the acquisition of the Daily Express, the Sunday Express and the Daily Star. He retired from his full-time career in 1990.

== Later life ==
In later life, Linacre was active in the running of the University of Leeds: from 1985 to 1992, he was a member of its University Council and from 1995 to 2000, he was a member its University Court. He also kept ties with journalism, and served as President, a mainly honorary role, of Yorkshire Post Newspapers Ltd from 1990 until his death.

Linacre died on 5 February 2015, aged 94.

== Personal life ==
In 1943, Linacre married Irene Amy Gordon. Together they had two daughters; Anthea and Phillipa. His wife predeceased him, dying in 2013.

== Honours ==
Linacre received multiple honours for service during the Second World War. On 23 December 1941, he was awarded the Distinguished Flying Medal (DFM). He was mentioned in despatches on 8 June 1944. In the 1945 King's Birthday Honours, he was awarded the Air Force Cross (AFC).

In the 1979 New Year Honours, he was appointed Commander of the Order of the British Empire (CBE) "for services to journalism". In the 1986 Queen's Birthday Honours, he was appointed Knight Bachelor and therefore granted the title sir. On 5 November 1986, he was knighted by Queen Elizabeth II at Buckingham Palace.

In 1991, the University of Leeds awarded him an honorary Doctor of Laws (LLD) degree in recognition of "his contribution to journalism and the support of the arts and education".
