= Aaron Harper-Bailey =

English footballer

Personal information
- Date of birth: 29 September 2001 (age 25)
- Place of birth: Smethwick
- Height: 1.94 m (6 ft 4 in)
- Position: Defender

Team information
- Current team: Hednesford Town F.C.

Youth career
- –2022: Rushall Olympic
- 2022–2024: West Bromwich Albion

Senior career*
Years	Team	Apps	(Gls)
2022–2024	West Bromwich Albion	0	(0)
2024	→ Kidderminster Harriers (loan)	2	(0)
2024-2025	Drogheda United	14	(0)
2026	Oxford City	17	(0)
2026-	Hednesford Town F.C.	7	(0)
- * Club domestic league appearances and goals as of 16:34, 18 September 2026 (UTC)

Aaron Harper-Bailey (born 29 September 2001) is an English professional footballer who plays as a defender for National League North club Oxford City.

== Club career ==
=== Youth years ===
In July 2022, Harper-Bailey joined National League North club Rushall Olympic following a successful pre-season trial during which he impressed the coaching team. Just under 2 months later, his performance earned him a transfer to EFL Championship club West Bromwich Albion. He made over 28 appearances for the club's U23 team. Becoming a regular starter for the youth side in Premier League 2. Harper-Bailey left the club in late June following the expiration of his contract. He never made a senior appearance for the Baggies.

==== Kidderminster Harriers (loan) ====
On 26 January 2024, Harper-Bailey joined on an initial one-month loan. The player made 2 appearances for the Harriers during his short time at the club, featuring against Oxford City and Gateshead . Harper-Bailey returned to West Bromwich Albion on 23 February of the same year, following the end of his loan.

=== Drogheda United ===
On 29 July 2024, Harper-Bailey signed a permanent deal with League of Ireland Premier Division club Drogheda United following the expiration of his contract at West Brom. He made his debut for Drogheda on 16 August 2024 as a substitute in a 9-0 FAI Cup third round win against Wilton United. In November 2024, he was an unused substitute in the 2024 FAI Cup final as his side defeated Derry City at the Aviva Stadium.

=== Oxford City ===
On 9 January 2026, Harper-Bailey signed for National League North club Oxford City.

=== Hednesford Town Football Club ===
On 1 July 2026, Harper-Bailey signed for National League North club Hednesford Town F.C. .

== Style of play ==
Harper-Bailey is a left-footed Defender with strong physical attributes.

== Career statistics ==
As of match played on 5 September 2025

Appearances and goals by club, season and competition
Club	Season	League			National Cup (Note: Includes FA Cup & FAI Cup)		League Cup (Note: Includes EFL Cup)		Other		Total	
Club	Season	Division	Apps	Goals	Apps	Goals	Apps	Goals	Apps	Goals	Apps	Goals
West Bromwich Albion	2023–24	EFL Championship	0	0	0	0	0	0	—		0	0
Kidderminster Harriers (loan)	2023–24	National League	2	0	—		—		1 (Note: Appearance(s) in the FA Trophy)	0	3	0
Drogheda United	2024	LOI Premier Division	3	0	1	0	—		1 (Note: Appearance(s) in the Leinster Senior Cup)	0	5	0
Drogheda United	2025	LOI Premier Division	5	0	1	0	—		3 (Note: 1 appearance in the President of Ireland's Cup; 2 appearances in the Leinster Senior Cup)	0	9	0
Drogheda United	Total		8	0	2	0	—		4	0	14	0
Oxford City	2025–26	National League North	0	0	—		—		—		0	0
Career Total			10	0	2	0	0	0	5	0	17	0

== Honours ==
Drogheda United

- FAI Cup: 2024
