= Wymondham College =

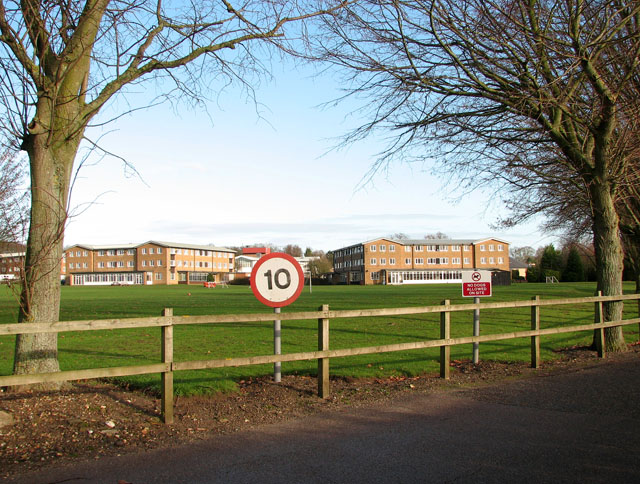
- View of Wymondham College houses

Location
- Golf Links Road; Morley; Wymondham, Norfolk, NR18 9SZ; England; 52°32′42″N 1°03′26″E

Information
- Former name: Wymondham Grammar School
- Type: State Boarding & Day School
- Motto: Floreat Sapientia (Let Wisdom Flourish)
- Established: 1951
- Founder: Lincoln Ralphs
- Trust: Sapientia Education Trust https://www.se-trust.org/
- Department for Education URN: 136481 Tables
- Ofsted: Reports
- CEO: Jonathan Taylor OBE
- Principal: Emma Arrand
- Chaplain: Rev. I Jones
- Staff: 400+
- Gender: Coeducational
- Age: 4 to 18
- Enrolment: 1,427
- Hours in school day: 7hrs 15mins (Sat: 3hrs 30mins)
- Campus size: 83 ac.
- Houses: 7
- Slogan: Floreat Sapientia (May Wisdom Flourish)
- Publication: Wymondham College Magazine
- Alumni: Old Wymondhamians
- Social care unique reference number: SC055089
- Website: www.wymondhamcollege.org

Wymondham College is a co-educational day and boarding school located in Morley, near Wymondham in Norfolk, England. As a former grammar school with academy status, it is one of England's state boarding schools and the largest of its type in the country, with up to 700 boarding places, and its own Preparatory school.

== History ==
=== Former military hospital ===
The school is built on the site of the Second World War USAAF 231st Station Hospital, When the school first opened in 1951 the hospital's forty Nissen huts were used as dormitories. It was established by Lincoln Ralphs, the chief education officer of Norfolk County Council. Brick-built accommodation began to appear in the late 1950s, but Nissen huts remained in use, principally for classrooms and storage, through to end of the 1990s. The only Nissen hut now remaining is the College chapel. A memorial garden has been created on the site of the former USAAF mortuary, which for many years was used as the school's technical drawing classroom.

=== Grammar school ===
In 1951 there were two separate schools, Grammar and Technical, each with separate Heads. They merged in the mid-1950s after an uneasy co-existence. The school was a co-educational boarding grammar school. It was intended for academically gifted children with no grammar schools in their local area that they could attend, as well as those with parents abroad or who regularly moved around the country. It gave priority, where possible, to children from families where the parents had separated, thus possibly under financial hardship. Admissions were by examination and headmasters' reports. In the mid-1970s, the school had 700 boarders and 750 day pupils (from the former county grammar school). By 1978 this was 1,000 day pupils as well as the 700 boarders. Margaret Thatcher visited the school in 1974.

The school remained exclusively 'boarding' until the early 1970s, when it was merged with the County Grammar School, which had been hosted at Wymondham on a 'temporary' basis for nearly ten years.

The school in the 1970s had been in a state of disrepair with an out-dated water supply and drainage system, and had an unreliable heating system (built by the USAF in 1944) in the winter and lack of insulation. Despite these problems it was still producing outstanding academic results. Grammar school status was lost, and in the early 1990s it became a grant maintained school. The Duke of Edinburgh visited the school in 1990.

View of the College library facing a quad, surrounded by cloisters.

=== Academies Act 2010 ===
In 2010 the school became an academy as part of the Academies Act 2010. The school maintains both boarding fee-charges, with free tuition till present. The college won the ‘UK secondary school’ of the year award at the national teaching awards in November 2021. In October 2023 the college was graded as ‘Outstanding’ by Ofsted in both education and boarding inspections, with all 9 inspected areas rated as ‘outstanding’. Wymondham College also founded a multi-academy trust, the Sapientia Education Trust. Jonathan Taylor, CEO of Sapientia, and former Principal was awarded an OBE for services to education and school improvement in The King's Birthday Honours 2026.

=== Wymondham College Prep School ===
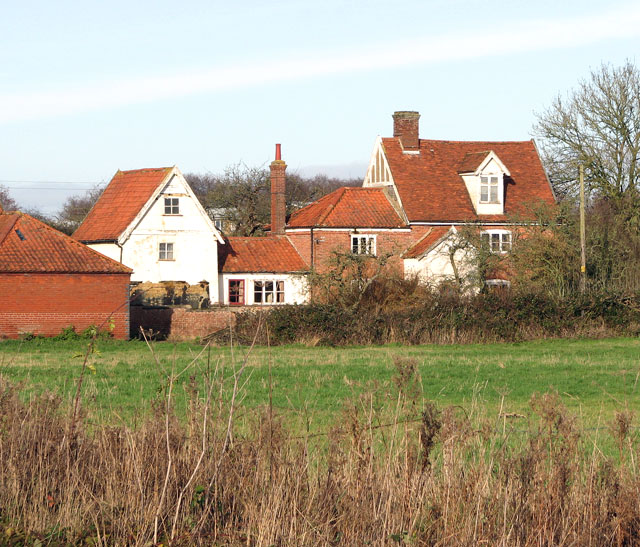
Wymondham College's farmhouse

In 2019, the Sapientia Education Trust announced plans to unveil a new, purpose-built building to house a new preparatory school with boarding facilities for children from reception to Year 6, led by Mr Simon Underhill, with a vision to fostering 'development for the whole child'. Despite initial plans to purchase adjacent farmland for the new prep school, construction by Morgan Sindall took place on the lawn of the former Cavell Hall. The Lord Lieutenant of Norfolk, Lady Dannatt MBE, and Adrian Underwood OBE, ex-Governor of Wymondham College and ex-Trustee of Sapientia Education Trust, led a short ceremony to commemorate the opening of Wymondham College Prep School and its boarding house named after Adrian Underwood, Underwood Hall..

== School Houses ==
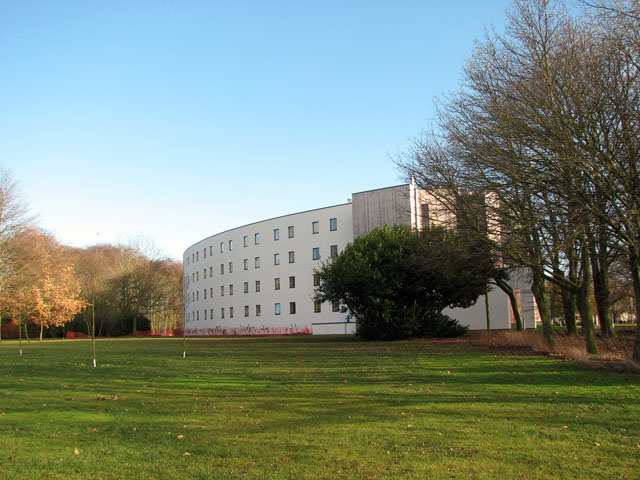
Rear view of Lincoln Hall

As a full boarding school with lessons from Mondays to Saturdays, all boarders and day pupils at Wymondham College belong to a boarding house. There are now seven boarding houses which also includes a sixth form house (Lincoln Hall), (Year 8–11), and a junior boarding house (Underwood Hall) for the prep school. Pupils in the sixth form are affiliated with one of the four senior boarding houses (Cavell, New, Kett, Fry) but reside in the sixth form boarding house, Lincoln Hall.

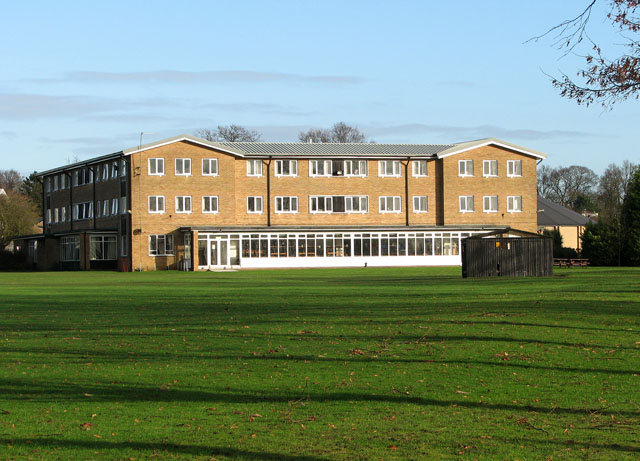
Elizabeth Fry Hall

| Boarding House | Year Group | Colour |
|---|---|---|
| Cavell Hall | Senior | Light Blue |
| New Hall | Senior | Red |
| Kett Hall | Senior | Dark Green |
| Fry Hall | Senior | Yellow |
| Year 7 Day House (Formerly Peel Hall) | Year 7 | All Of Above |
| Lincoln Hall | Sixth Form | Affiliated Senior House |
| Underwood Hall | Year 5–6 | Cyan |

A House system was first established in 1953, with house names North, South, East and West. As the college expanded and brick-built accommodation came into use in the early 1960s, the system was revised and the Houses were given names of cathedral cities:

- Boys: York, Gloucester, Canterbury, Norwich, Durham, Salisbury
- Girls: Wells, Westminster, Worcester, Winchester (with Wakefield and Washington added later)

When mixed Houses were introduced in the early 1970s, the cathedral House names were scrapped and the Houses adopted the names of the Halls themselves. Lincoln Hall was converted to a Sixth Form boarding house in 1978. Peel Hall was converted to a Year 7 House in 1995 however the change was reversed a year later. However, it was re-purposed as the Year 7 Day House in 2025 and no longer holds students for boarding

Ofsted inspected the residential accommodation in 2023 and confirmed it remains 'outstanding'.

== Archaeology ==
In January 1958, a hoard of 881 Anglo Saxon (Edward the Elder) coins were found at the school when a drain was being dug.

== Old Wymondhamians ==
- Mark Brayne, BBC foreign correspondent and psychotherapist
- Stephen Byers, Labour MP for North Tyneside from 1992 until 2010, former Chief Secretary to the Treasury, Secretary of State for Trade and Industry, and Secretary of State for Transport, Local Government and the Regions in the Cabinet
- Patsy Calton Lib Dem for MP for Cheadle from 2001 to 2005 (1960–1967)
- Nicholas Crane, explorer and writer (1965–1972)
- Anya Culling, Runner
- Justin Edrich, cricketer (1972–1977)
- Mike Gascoyne, Technical Director of Lotus F1 Racing (1974–1981)
- Norman Lamb, Liberal Democrat MP from 2001 for North Norfolk, Minister of State for Care and Support (1969–76)
- Colin Self, artist (1952–1959)
- Trudy Stevenson, Zimbabwe Ambassador to Senegal (1955–1962)
- Mark Strong, actor in Our Friends in the North, and narrator of Who Do You Think You Are (1974–1981)
- Adam Rayner, actor in Mistresses (1998)
- Peter Rogers, Chief Executive since 2003 of Babcock International Group plc (1959–1966)
- Will Evans, Professional Rugby Union Player
- George Worth, Professional Rugby Union Player

=== Wymondham Grammar School ===
- Sir Frederick William Wilson, Liberal MP from 1895 to 1906 for Mid Norfolk (1855–62)

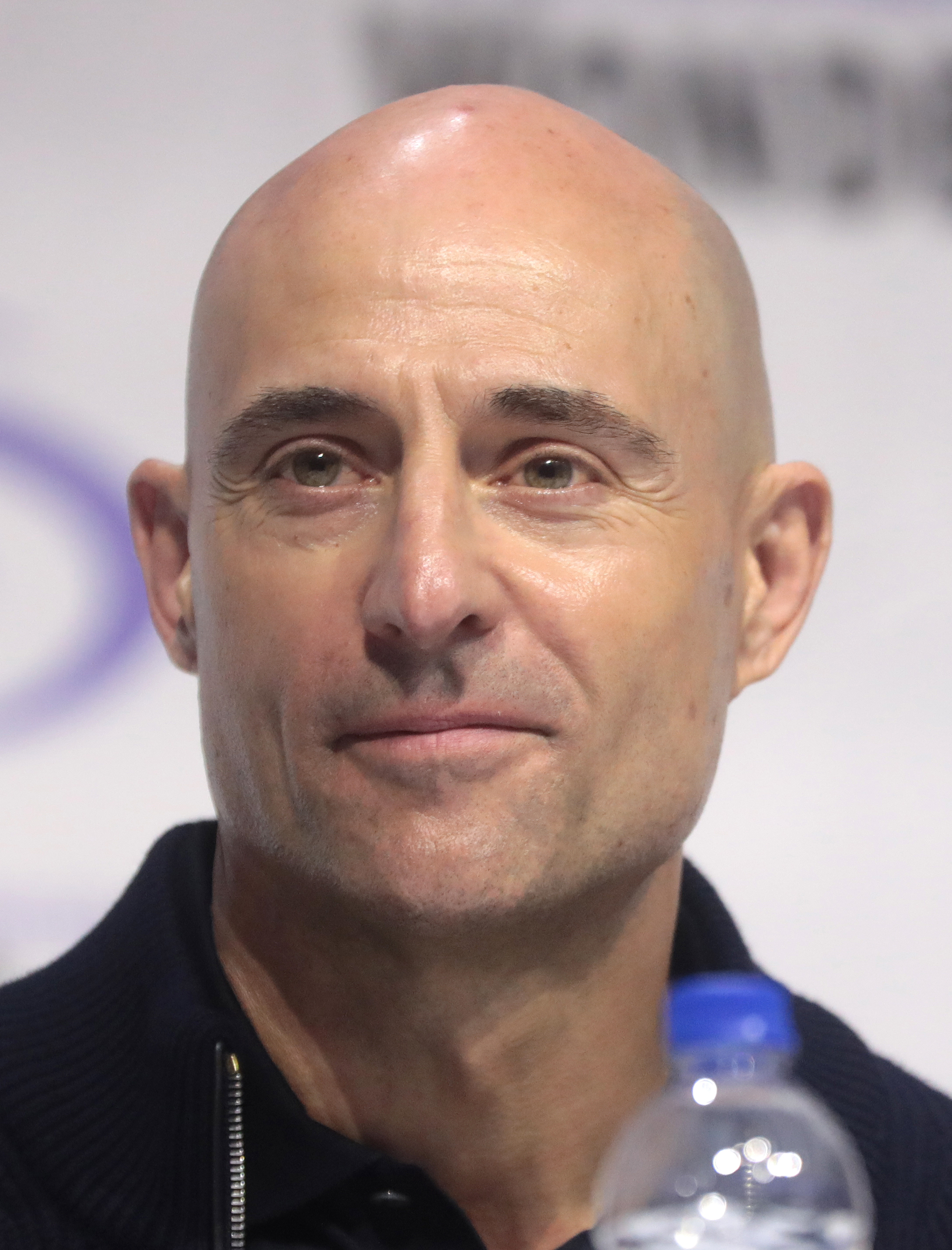
Mark Strong (actor), former pupil of the college

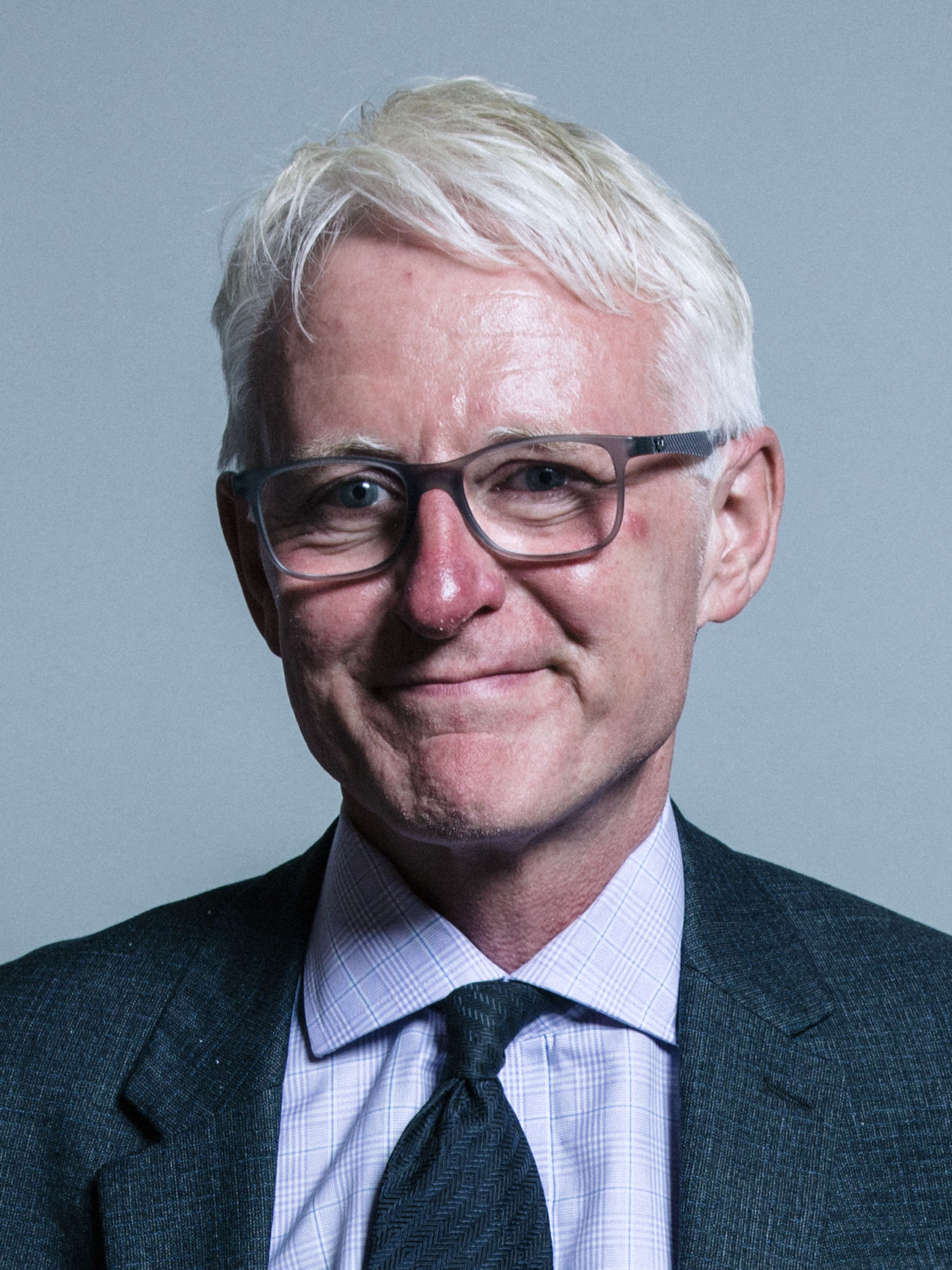
Norman Lamb, former pupil and minister of state

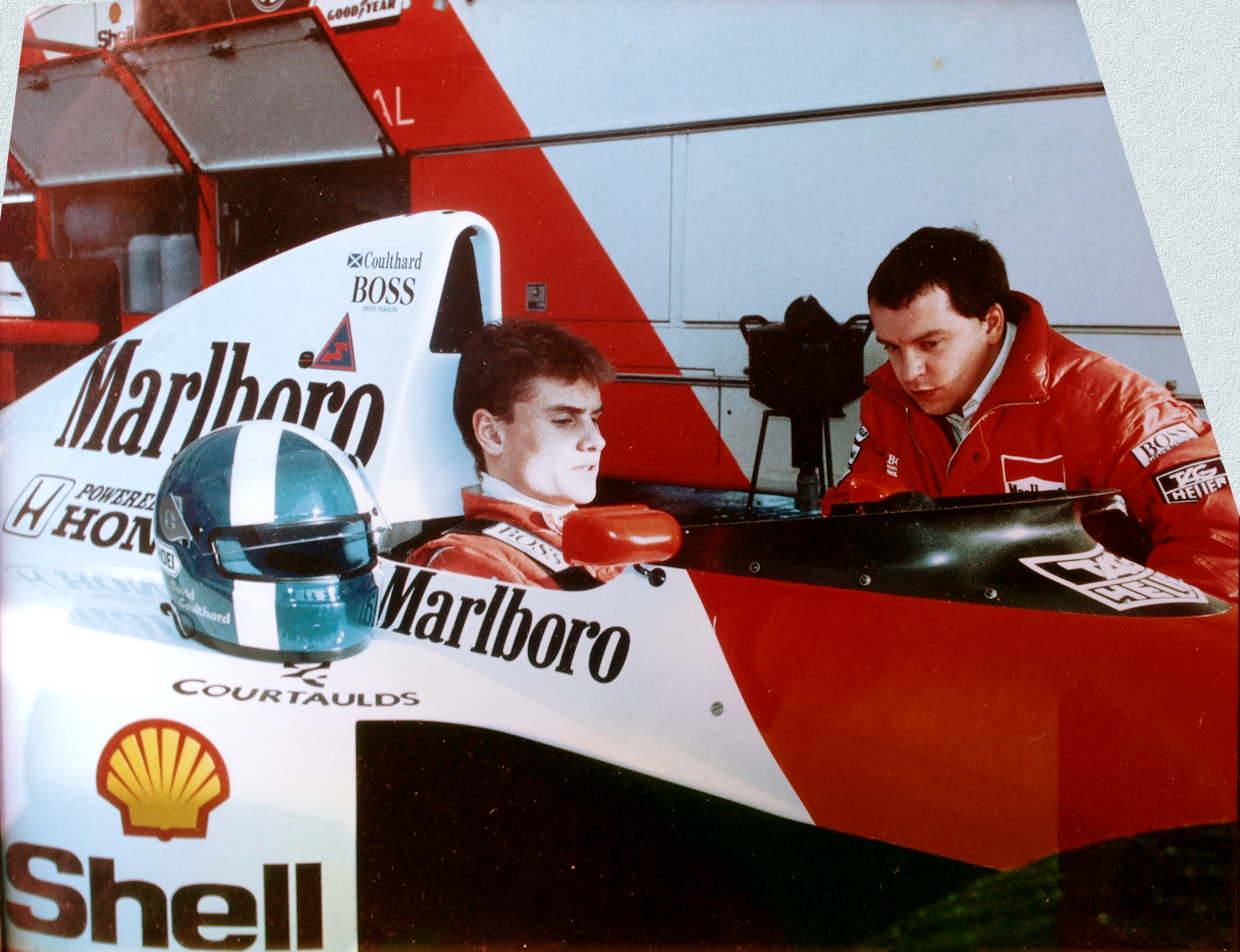
Mike Gascoyne (right), former pupil and Formula One engineer, with David Coulthard

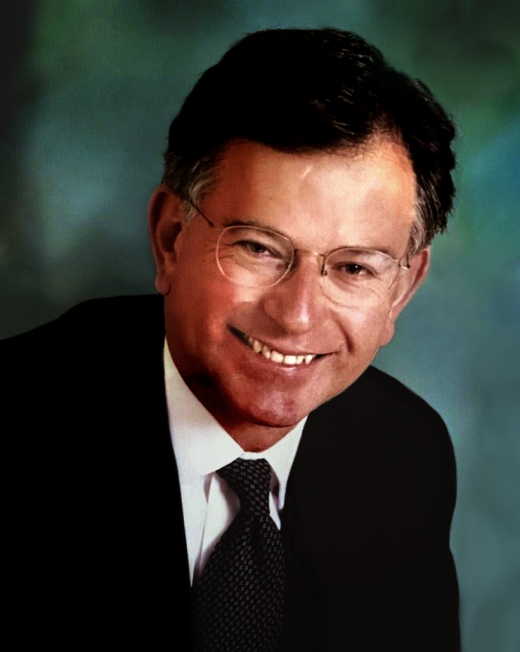
Stephen Byers MP, former pupil and ex-Labour MP, former Chief Secretary to the Treasury, Secretary of State for Trade and Industry, and Secretary of State for Transport, Local Government and the Regions
