= Hednesford Town F.C. =

Association football club in England

Hednesford Town
- Full name: Hednesford Town Football Club
- Nickname: The Pitmen
- Founded: 1880
- Ground: Keys Park, Hednesford
- Capacity: 6,039 (1,011 seated)
- Owner(s): Craig and Amanda Gwilt
- Manager: Kelvin Davis
- League: National League North
- 2025–26: Northern Premier League Premier Division, 2nd of 21 (promoted via play-offs)
- Website: htfc.co.uk
Home colours	Away colours

Hednesford Town Football Club is a football club based in Hednesford, Staffordshire, England. They are currently members of the National League North and play at Keys Park. They won the FA Trophy in 2004.

== History ==
The club was established in 1880 as a merger of the Red & Whites and Hill Top. Based at the Anglesey Hotel, they were sometimes known as Hednesford Anglesey. The club were founder members of the Birmingham & District League in 1889 and finished sixth in their first season. Despite finishing third in 1890–91, they left the league at the end of the season, and played only friendly matches before joining the Walsall & District Junior League in 1894. The club were runners-up in the league in their first two seasons, before the league was renamed the Walsall & District League in 1897.

Hednesford were league runners-up again in 1899–1900 and 1901–02. After finishing third in 1907–08, they joined the Birmingham Combination, which they won in 1909–10. After World War II the club rejoined the Birmingham & District League. They reached the first round of the FA Cup for the first time in 1919–20, losing 2–0 at Castleford Town. The club finished bottom of the league in 1924–25, 1925–26 and 1931–32. They withdrew from the league during the 1937–38 season and folded before reforming as Hednesford. The new club rejoined the Birmingham & District League for the 1938–39 season; however, with the league reduced to 10 clubs, two round robin leagues were played – the King's Cup, in which the club finished bottom of the table, and the League Cup, in which they finished second-from-bottom.

After World War II Hednesford joined the Birmingham Combination. They won the league in 1950–51 and were runners-up in 1952–53, after which they rejoined the Birmingham & District League. The league was split into two divisions for the 1954–55 season, with Hednesford playing in the Northern Division. A thirteenth-place finish saw them placed in Division Two the following season. They remained in Division Two until the league was reduced to a single division in 1960. In 1962 the league was renamed the West Midlands (Regional) League. Hednesford became members of the Premier Division when the league gained a second division in 1965. The club returned to its original name in 1971, and in 1972 they joined the Midland League. However, after finishing bottom of the table in 1973–77, the club left the league, returning to the Premier Division of the West Midlands (Regional) League. They were league champions in 1977–78, and after finishing as runners-up in 1983–84, the club moved up to the Midland Division of the Southern League.

In 1991–92 Hednesford were Midland Division runners-up, earning promotion to the Premier Division; they also reached the final of the Welsh Cup, losing 1–0 to Cardiff City. They won the Premier Division in 1994–95 and were promoted to the Football Conference. In their first season in the Conference the club finished third. The 1996–97 season saw the club reach the first round of the FA Cup for the first time since 1919–20. After beating Southport 2–1 in the first round, they defeated Second Division clubs Blackpool in the second round and York City in the third round, winning both games 1–0. In the fourth round they were drawn at home to Premier League Middlesbrough. However, the match was played at Boro's Riverside Stadium. In what was a close game Hednesford lost the tie 3–2.

The following season saw Hednesford entered directly into the first round of the FA Cup, where they defeated Hull City 2–0, before losing 1–0 to Darlington in the second round. The club reached the second round again in 1998–99, beating Barnet 3–1 in the first round before losing 3–1 at Cardiff City. A gradual decline in league performances saw them finish bottom of the table in 2000–01, resulting in relegation back to the Southern League's Premier Division. In 2003–04 the club reached the final of the FA Trophy, winning the competition with a 3–2 win over Canvey Island at Villa Park. In 2004–05 they finished fourth in the Premier Division, qualifying for the promotion play-offs; after beating Merthyr Tydfil 5–3 on penalties in the semi-finals after a 1–1 draw, they beat Chippenham Town 1–0 in the final to earn promotion to the Conference North.

Hednesford finished bottom of the Conference North in 2005–06, resulting in an immediate relegation, this time to the Premier Division of the Northern Premier League. In 2009 they were transferred to the Southern League's Premier Division, and a fourth-place finish in 2009–10 saw them qualify for the play-offs again, this time losing 2–0 to Chippenham in the semi-finals. They were Premier Division runners-up the following season; another play-off campaign saw them beat Leamington 3–1 in the semi-finals before losing 3–2 on penalties to Salisbury City in the final after the game had ended 2–2. The club were transferred back to the Northern Premier League in 2011 and finished fifth in 2011–12 before losing 5–0 to Bradford Park Avenue in the play-off semi-finals.

A fourth successive play-off campaign was secured when Hednesford were Premier Division runners-up in 2012–13. After beating AFC Fylde 3–1 on penalties in the semi-finals following a 3–3 draw, they defeated F.C. United of Manchester 2–1 in the final, earning promotion to the Conference North. Their first season back in the Conference North ended with a fourth-place finish and a play-off semi-final defeat to Altrincham, losing 4–3 on aggregate. In 2015–16 they finished second-from-bottom of the renamed National League North and were relegated to the Northern Premier League's Premier Division. The 2022–23 season saw them relegated to Division One West of the Northern Premier League. In 2024–25 they were runners-up in Division One West. After beating Vauxhall Motors 3–1 in the play-off semi-finals, the club defeated Congleton Town 2–0 in the final to earn promotion to the Premier Division.

In 2025–26 Hednesford were runners-up in the Northern Premier League Premier Division. In the subsequent play-offs they beat Stockton Town 2–0 in the semi-finals and then won the final against Warrington Rylands on penalties, securing back-to-back promotions, this time to the National League North.

== Ground ==
The club originally played at a ground behind the Anglesey Hotel, which became known as 'the Tins' due to the metal sheeting that was erected around the ground. In 1904 they moved to the Cross Keys ground after a local councillor agreed to pay off the club's £40 debt if they moved away from the Tins. The first match at the new stadium drew a crowd of 900 to see Hednesford beat Stafford 3–1. A large wooden stand was erected on one side of the pitch and banking on the other. The banking was replaced by a pitch-length stand in the 1950s and floodlights were installed in 1953, with over 7,000 attending the inauguration match in which local rivals Wolves defeated West Brom 4–2.

By the 1990s the capacity of Cross Keys had been reduced to around 4,000. The final match at the ground saw Hednesford beat Leek Town to secure the Southern League title and promotion to the Football Conference in front of 2,776 spectators. The club then moved to Keys Park, which was built at a cost of £1.3m. The ground initially had a capacity of 3,500, but was expanded during the 1997–98 season and now has a capacity of 6,039, of which 1,011 is seated and 5,335 covered. The record attendance at Keys Park was set when 4,784 spectators attended the Northern Premier League Premier Division match against FC United of Manchester on 27 December 2025.

== Current squad ==
As of 26 September 2026

Note: Flags indicate national team as defined under FIFA eligibility rules; some limited exceptions apply. Players may hold more than one non-FIFA nationality.

No.	Pos.	Nation	Player
1	GK	ENG	Sam Hornby
2	DF	ENG	Jamie Morgan
3	DF	ENG	Joel Taylor
4	DF	ENG	George Langston
5	DF	ENG	Aaron Hayden
6	DF	ENG	George Williams
7	MF	ENG	Jamie Cooke
8	MF	NIR	Dale Gorman
9	FW	ENG	Aaron Jarvis
10	MF	SKN	Omari Sterling-James
11	FW	JAM	Ahkeem Rose
14	FW	ENG	Dylan Mottley-Henry
15	DF	ENG	Aaron Harper-Bailey

No.	Pos.	Nation	Player
16	MF	IRL	Liam Kinsella
17	FW	ENG	Jay Fitzmartin
18	GK	SKN	Xander Parke
19	DF	MSR	Lenni Cirino
20	FW	ENG	David Abimbola
21	MF	AUS	Jai Curran-Nicholls
23	MF	ENG	Jacob Gwilt
24	MF	EGY	Sonny Sharples-Ahmed
26	GK	NIR	Will Murdock (on loan from Manchester United)
27	DF	ENG	George Ward (on loan from Boston United)
28	FW	ENG	Danny Whitehall
30	FW	ENG	Will Merry
31	DF	ENG	Niall Maher

=== Out on loan ===
Note: Flags indicate national team as defined under FIFA eligibility rules; some limited exceptions apply. Players may hold more than one non-FIFA nationality.

Pos.	Nation	Player
FW	ENG	Jonny Edwards (at Bedford Town until 30 June 2027)
FW	ENG	Dan Turner (at Ashton United until 30 June 2027)
FW	ENG	Niall Watson (at FC United of Manchester until 30 June 2027)

== Management and coaching staff ==
Position	Name
Manager	Kelvin Davis
Assistant Manager	Danny Butterfield
Coach	Jared Hodgkiss
Goalkeeping coach	Liam Stoneley
Head of Sports Therapy	Adam Paget
Sports Therapist	Dan Brayson
Head of Analysis	Sean O'Callaghan
Kitman	Mark Thornley

== Honours ==
- FA Trophy
  - Winners 2003–04
- Southern League
  - Premier Division champions 1994–95
  - League Cup winners 2010–11
  - Championship Trophy winners 1994–95
- West Midlands (Regional) League
  - Champions 1940–41, 1977–78
  - League Cup winners 1962–63, 1983–84
- Birmingham Combination
  - Champions 1909–10, 1950–51
- Birmingham Senior Cup
  - Winners 1935–36, 2008–09, 2012–13
- Staffordshire Senior Cup
  - Winners 1897–98, 1969–70, 1973–74, 2012–13

== Records ==
- Best FA Cup performance: Fourth round, 1996–97
- Best FA Trophy performance: Winners, 2003–04
- Best Welsh Cup performance: Finalists, 1991–92
- Most appearances: Kevin Foster (470)
- Most goals: Joe O'Connor (220)
- Record transfer fee paid: £12,000 to Macclesfield Town for Steve Burr, 1992–93
- Record transfer fee received: £40,000 from Arsenal for Cohen Bramall, 2017
- Biggest win: 12–1 vs Redditch United, Birmingham Combination, 1952–53
- Heaviest defeat: 15–0 vs Burton

== See also ==
- Hednesford Town F.C. players
- Hednesford Town F.C. managers
