= Mike Dean (referee) =

English football referee (born 1968)

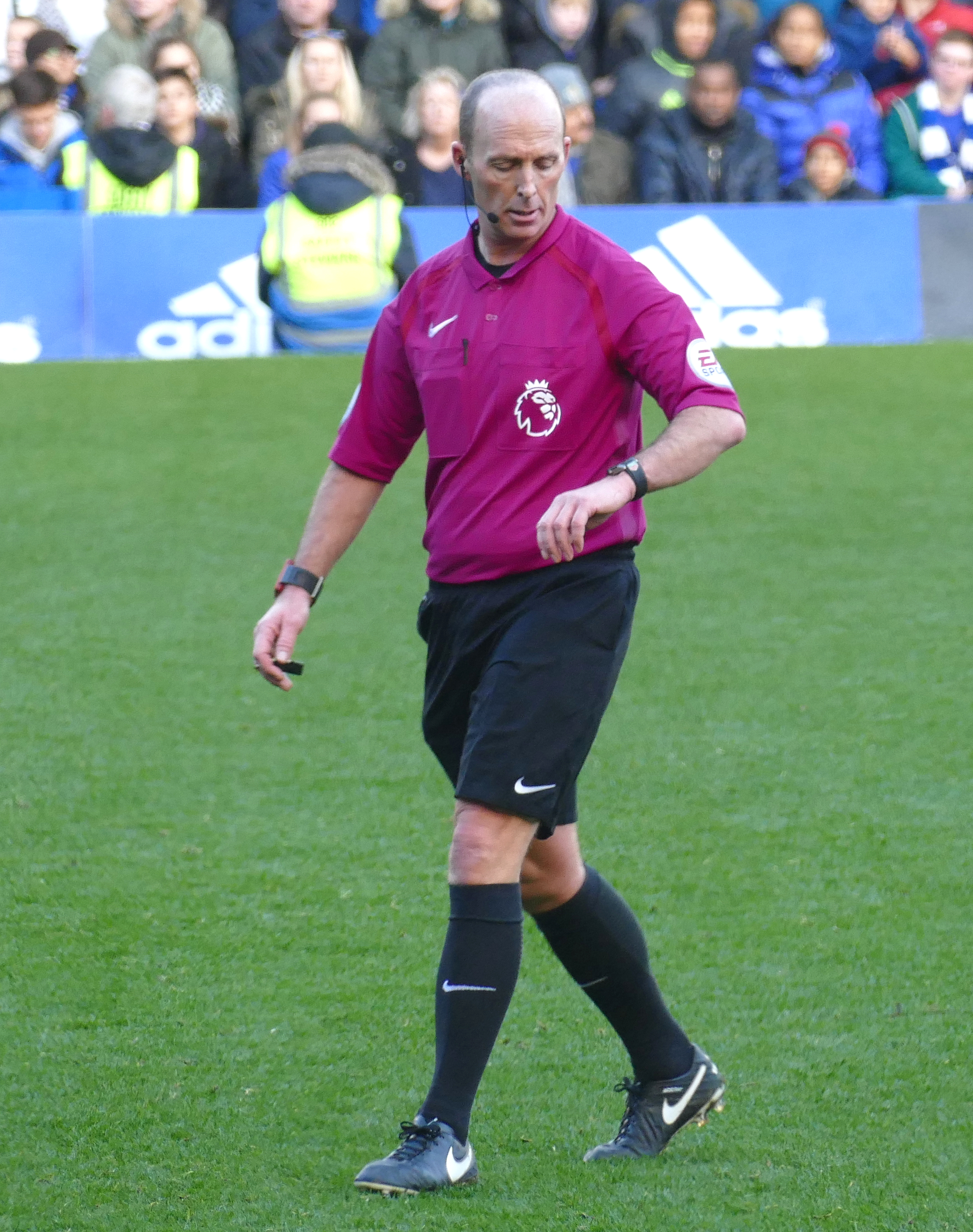
- Dean in 2016
- Full name: Mike Dean
- Born: 2 June 1968 (age 58); Wirral, England

Domestic
Years	League	Role
?–1997	(England) Northern Premier League	Referee
1995–1997	(England) The Football League	Assistant referee
1997–2000	(England) The Football League	Referee
2000–2022	(England) Premier League	Referee

International
Years	League	Role
2003–2013	FIFA listed	Referee

Mike Dean (born 2 June 1968) is an English former professional football referee primarily in the Premier League. He is based in Heswall, Wirral, in North West England, and is a member of the Cheshire County Football Association.

Since his appointment as a Select Group referee in 2000, Dean officiated a number of notable matches, including the FA Community Shield and the finals of the FA Cup, Football League Cup and FA Trophy before retiring as a referee in 2022 and as a video assistant referee (VAR) in 2023.

== Career ==
=== Early career ===
Dean began refereeing in 1985. He progressed to officiate in the Northern Premier League as a referee, becoming a Football League assistant referee in 1995 and being promoted to the full referees' list in 1997. Until the Premier League professionalised its referee system in 2001, Dean also worked in a chicken slaughterhouse.

=== Professional career ===
Dean was appointed to the Select Group of referees for the Premier League in 2000, being subsequently promoted to the FIFA international referees' list in 2003. Also in 2003, he was fourth official to Graham Barber at the FA Cup final held at Cardiff's Millennium Stadium, where Arsenal beat Southampton 1–0.

Dean took control of the 2004 FA Community Shield match between Arsenal and Manchester United at the Millennium Stadium, a game which Arsenal won 3–1. He also refereed the FA Trophy final of that year.

Dean was originally appointed to referee the 2006 FA Cup final at the Millennium Stadium on 13 May 2006 but the Football Association later replaced him with Alan Wiley after concerns were raised about Dean's ability to be impartial towards Liverpool, who are based near his hometown in Wirral. Dean made it to the Millennium Stadium eight days later though, when he refereed the Championship play-off final between Leeds United and Watford.

Dean's highest refereeing honour came on 17 May 2008 when he took charge of that year's FA Cup final between Portsmouth and Cardiff City, with Trevor Massey and Martin Yerby as his assistants and Chris Foy as the fourth official. Dean issued three cautions during the match at Wembley Stadium, which was won 1–0 by Portsmouth.

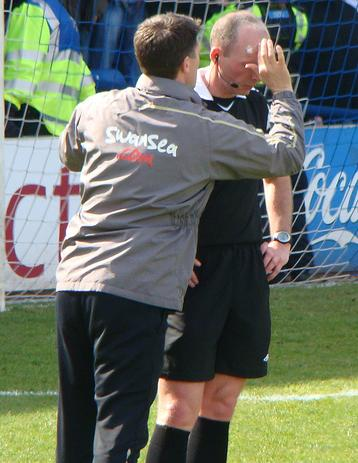
Dean receives treatment after being struck by a coin during a South Wales derby in 2009.

On 5 April 2009, in a South Wales derby between Cardiff City and Swansea City, Dean suffered a cut to the forehead resulting from what appeared to be a coin thrown by a Cardiff supporter. He later awarded Cardiff a penalty kick, which was converted to earn a draw for the home side. Cardiff's chairman Peter Ridsdale condemned the attack and said that the supporter would be given a lifelong ban if found guilty. A 24-year-old man was later convicted over the incident and given a three-year ban and £200 fine. No action was taken by the Football Association of Wales against Cardiff City.

On 31 January 2011, Dean was appointed to referee the 2011 League Cup final between Arsenal and Birmingham City. Birmingham won the match 2–1, with an 89th-minute winning goal by Obafemi Martins. The Blues had taken the lead through Nikola Žigić, before Robin van Persie equalised for Arsenal. Dean issued five yellow cards during the course of the final.

In January 2017, Dean was criticised after giving a straight red card to West Ham midfielder Sofiane Feghouli for a coming together with Manchester United defender Phil Jones, after which Jones writhed on the floor in apparent pain. The red card came after only 15 minutes and with the score at 0–0; Manchester United eventually won the game 2–0. Replays suggested that it was in fact Jones who had committed a dangerous challenge on Feghouli and was himself lucky not to have been sent off. Feghouli's red card was later rescinded.

On 2 April 2019, during a game between Wolverhampton Wanderers and Manchester United at Molineux, Dean issued the 100th red card of his career as a Premier League referee to Manchester United's Ashley Young, making Dean the first referee in Premier League history to reach the 100 red cards milestone.

In February 2021, Dean and his family received bomb threats following two controversial decisions which saw Dean give a red card to Southampton's Jan Bednarek and West Ham's Tomáš Souček in successive games, and asked not to officiate the following weekend Premier League fixtures. Both red cards were rescinded by the FA.

Dean made a cameo appearance as himself in Season 2, Episode 8 of the American television series Ted Lasso. He also made another cameo appearance as himself in Season 3, Episode 12 of Ted Lasso as the referee in the game between the fictional AFC Richmond and West Ham United.

Dean's retirement was made known on 21 March 2022. He refereed his final game on Matchday 38 of the 2021–22 Premier League season. Chelsea won 2–1 against Watford in this game.

On 16 August 2022, Dean was dropped as a video assistant referee (VAR) for a single round in the 2022–23 Premier League season after a controversial performance during a league fixture the day prior between Chelsea and Tottenham. The controversy surrounds Tottenham's first equaliser by Pierre-Emile Hojbjerg, first on his potential foul on Chelsea's Kai Havertz and subsequently his shot that led to the goal, with Tottenham's Richarlison standing in an offside position and potentially blocking Chelsea's Edouard Mendy line of vision. The other was Tottenham's Cristian Romero's hair pull on Chelsea's Marc Cucurella at the final moments of the game, a disallowed action that was reviewed by Dean as not being a foul, leading to Spurs' late equaliser by Harry Kane in the subsequent corner. Two days later on 18 August, Dean personally admitted his mistake in regards to the incident, adding that he should have asked Anthony Taylor, the referee during the fixture, to review the hair pull on the pitch-side monitor instead of carrying on.

Dean retired as a video assistant referee (VAR) official in 2023.

=== European and international matches ===
Dean first international match came in 2004 when he was appointed to a friendly between the Netherlands and Republic of Ireland at the Amsterdam Arena. The away side won 1–0 thanks to a Robbie Keane goal.

On 30 September 2010, Dean refereed a Europa League group stage match between Borussia Dortmund and Sevilla. Early in the second half he showed a second yellow card to Dortmund player Marcel Schmelzer for diving.

Dean has also officiated European Championship qualifying matches. His first appointment was to the Euro 2008 group F qualifier between Iceland and Latvia on 13 October 2007. The game in the Icelandic capital Reykjavík ended with a 4–2 win for the visitors. Dean's next European Championship match was on 12 October 2010 when he oversaw a group A qualifier for Euro 2012 between Belgium and Austria in Brussels. The away team appeared to have secured a 3–2 victory but two Belgium goals on 87 and 89 minutes overturned that scoreline, only for ten-man Austria to score an injury-time equaliser to earn a 4–4 draw.

Dean stepped down from the FIFA international list at the end of 2013 at the mandatory retirement age of 45.

== Statistics ==
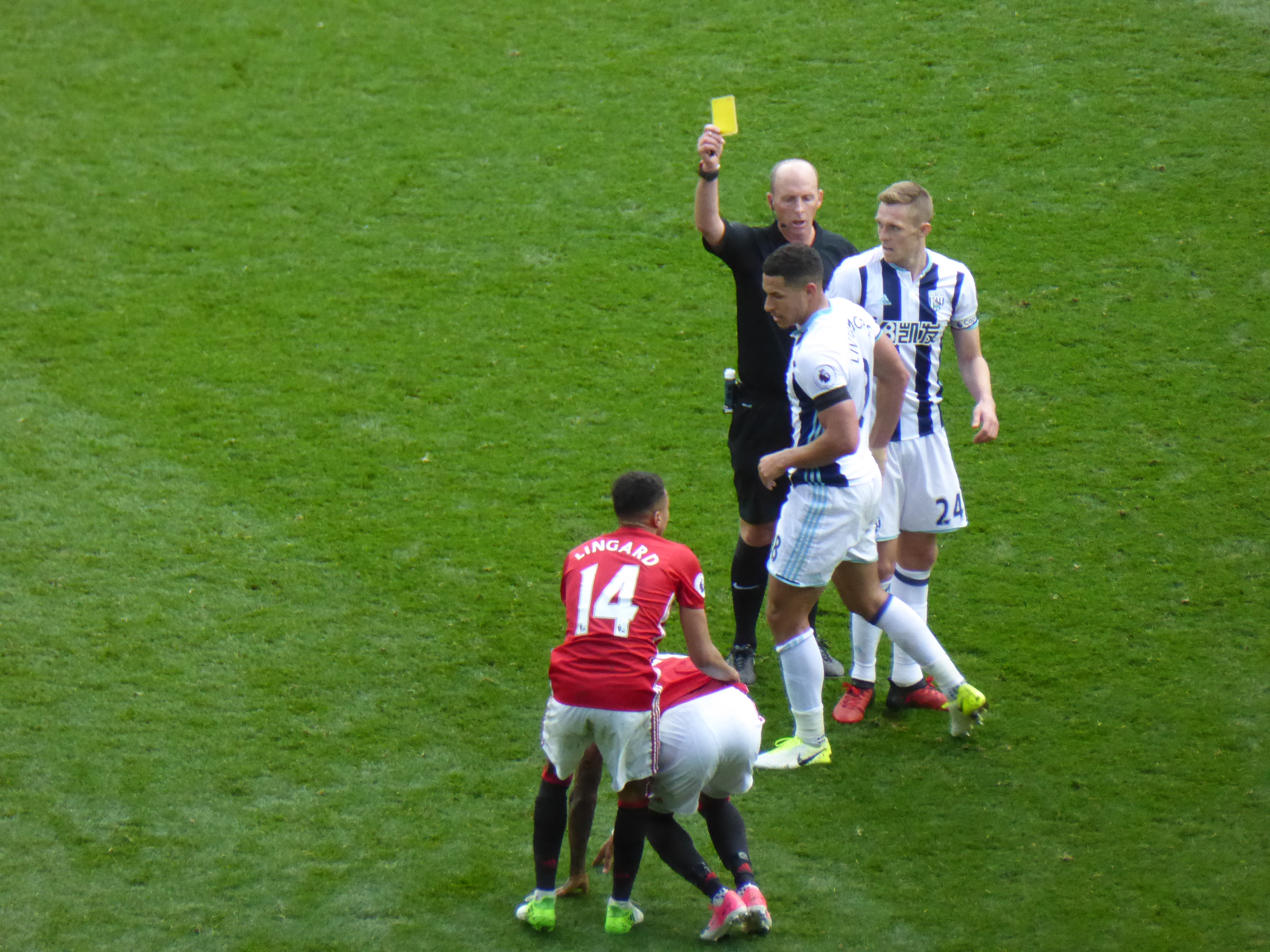
Dean brandishing a yellow card in a match between Manchester United and West Bromwich Albion in April 2017.

Season	Games	Total (yellow card)	(yellow card) per game	Total (red card)	(red card) per game
1997–98	30	83	2.77	5	0.17
1998–99	38	96	2.53	4	0.11
1999–2000	39	90	2.31	10	0.26
2000–01	37	106	2.86	4	0.11
2001–02	35	108	3.09	8	0.23
2002–03	36	155	4.31	9	0.25
2003–04	38	98	2.58	9	0.24
2004–05	24	66	2.75	7	0.29
2005–06	41	134	3.27	10	0.24
2006–07	43	173	4.02	16	0.37
2007–08	45	154	3.42	10	0.22
2008–09	44	156	3.55	12	0.27
2009–10	43	148	3.44	7	0.16
2010–11	43	147	3.42	7	0.16
2011–12	43	146	3.40	5	0.12
2012–13	40	143	3.58	4	0.10
2013–14	38	131	3.45	7	0.18
2014–15	38	158	4.16	8	0.21
2015–16	41	136	3.31	12	0.29
2016–17	36	138	3.83	5	0.14
2017–18	25	93	3.72	3	0.12
2018–19	29	129	4.45	10	0.34
2019–20	27	113	4.19	4	0.15
2020–21	30	111	3.70	9	0.30
2021–22	29	90	3.10	2	0.07

*updated as of 2021–22 season

Statistics are for all competitions. No records are available prior to 1997–98.

== Post Career Controversy ==
In September of 2026, Mike Dean appeared on the podcast "Having a party" by Jamie Vardy on which he admitted that he would "joke about" during matches. Examples he made included seeing how long he could go without blowing his whistle and how long he could stay in the centre circle. These remarks sparked worldwide criticism and backlash following which, Dean made a statement that it was never his intent to “criticise or undermine the integrity” of his fellow match officials which he reflected in an appearance on Sky Sports Soccer Saturday Programme.

== See also ==
- List of football referees

Preceded by Steve Bennett	FA Community Shield; 2004	Succeeded by Howard Webb
Preceded by Uriah Rennie	FA Trophy Final; 2004	Succeeded by Phil Dowd
