= Stuart Ford (footballer) =

English footballer

Stuart Ford (born 20 July 1971) is an English former professional football goalkeeper.

He started his career as an apprentice at Rotherham United in June 1987. He spent five years at Rotherham, but made just five league appearances. Despite serving a promising apprenticeship and helping the club win the Northern Intermediate Cup, he failed to dislodge Kelham O'Hanlon and then Billy Mercer as the number one keeper. After a successful loan spell at Scarborough FC at the end of 1991–92 season, he signed a one-year contract with the Seadogs, where he fought for the starting position with Mark Evans.

Scarborough's highlight of the 1992–93 season was a League Cup run, which included victories over Bradford City, Coventry City, Plymouth Argyle, before going out to a Nigel Winterburn goal against Arsenal. At the end of that season he was released by Scarborough, but Ford was signed by Doncaster Rovers to be understudy to Andy Beasley. After playing a handful of games at Rovers, Ford moved back to Scarborough, but after an injury plagued season and only a few first team appearances he was to find himself without a contract at a professional club in 1995.

In August 1995 he signed for non-league Gresley Rovers where he stayed for 5 years, helping them win the Southern League Championship. Due to ground grading Gresley could not take a place in the Conference. After winning many personal honours and establishing himself as a firm crowd favourite, he eventually moved on to Hednesford Town, Ilkeston Town and Alfreton Town, before finishing his career at AFC Barnsley. Ford helped them to promotion in his first season, losing just one league game and conceding just 18 goals.

In 2011, Ford launched a range of retro goalkeeping gloves.
