= Gresley Rovers F.C. =

Association football club in Church Gresley, England

Coordinates: 52°45′42″N 1°33′50″W

Gresley Rovers
- Full name: Gresley Rovers Football Club
- Nickname: The Moatmen
- Founded: 1882 (as Gresley Rovers)
- Ground: Moat Ground, Church Gresley
- Capacity: 2,400
- Chairman: Gary Norton
- Manager: Vacant
- League: United Counties League Premier Division North
- 2025–26: United Counties League Premier Division North, 10th of 20
Home colours	Away colours

Gresley Rovers Football Club is an English football club from Church Gresley, South Derbyshire. Gresley is a member of the United Counties League Premier Division North and plays home games at the Moat Ground. They were known as Gresley Rovers until 2009, when they were reformed under the name of Gresley F.C. In July 2020 the club readopted their original name, Gresley Rovers.

== History ==
=== Early years ===
Gresley Rovers were formed in 1882 in a small mining village of Church Gresley, near Swadlincote, Derbyshire. The club's first ground was at Mushroom Lane in Albert Village.

Gresley played only friendlies and cup games before joining the Burton Junior League for the 1892–93 season, winning their first title in 1894–95. Rovers acquired a new home, the Church Street Ground, in time for the 1895–96 season. Despite the ground's lack of facilities - with teams even having to change at the nearby Boot Hotel - the club was accepted into the Midland League for the 1903–04 season. At the end of the 1907–08 season, the Church Street Ground was acquired for building, so the club moved across the road into the current home, Moat Ground.

Gresley were promoted twice and joined the Central Alliance, before entering the Birmingham Combination in 1925.

Despite reaching the FA Cup First Round Proper in 1930–31, financial difficulties forced Gresley to exit the Birmingham Combination and return to the more local Central Alliance in 1933.

Rovers then moved to the Leicestershire Senior League and succeeded in the immediate post-war years; winning the league twice (1946–47, 1947–48) and finishing runners-up once (1948–49).

=== West Midlands League; six league titles, four Derbyshire Senior Cups, and a FA Vase final ===
Following brief stints in a number of divisions, Gresley rejoined the Central Alliance (later merged into the East Midlands Regional League) at the start of the 1959-60 campaign. There they embarked on a period of major success winning the title on four occasions. In fourteen seasons from 1961 to 1975, the lowest Gresley finished was fifth (4x 1st, 4x 2nd, 3x 3rd, 2x 4th, 1x 5th).

From 1975 to 1976, the club moved to the West Midlands (Regional) League. The Moatmen initially struggled in the more senior WMRL, but a runner-up spot in 1985–86 began a run of 4th, 4th, 2nd, 3rd, 1st, 1st in six consecutive seasons. The team also claimed the Derbyshire Senior Cup on four successive occasions in the same period. In 1990–91, Gresley earned the right to compete at Wembley in the FA Vase final. Opponents, Guiseley, lead 3–0 after 31 minutes but Gresley fought back to strike an injury-time equaliser. The Rovers then went 4-3 ahead in extra time before Guiseley scored an injury-time equaliser of their own to take it to a replay. Some national newspapers reported it as 'the most exciting Wembley Cup Final ever'. The replay at Bramall Lane saw Gresley lose 3–1 and denied a treble-winning season.

=== Southern League ===
Successful application placed Gresley in the Southern League Midland Division for the 1992–93 season, achieving promotion to its Premier Division at the first time of asking as well as reaching the FA Vase semi-final.

Life in the Premier Division began as Derbyshire Senior Cup winners and Southern League Cup finalists in 1993–94, an FA Cup First Round Proper appearance against Crewe and the appointments of Paul Futcher (and ex-England international Garry Birtles as assistant) in 1994–95, a Derbyshire Senior Cup win yet again in 1995–96.

1996–97 records the current highest ever league position achieved by Gresley as Southern League Premier Division champions. Rovers were unbeaten in their first seventeen league games (won 10 drawn 7) and were league leaders for 31 weeks. The title was finally won with a 3–1 home victory against Gloucester City on 26 April 1997. Gresley Rovers became the first Derbyshire side and first village side to win this prestigious trophy but ground grading meant that they were unable to gain promotion to the Football Conference. The game was also notable for serious crowd disorder between the two sets of fans after Gresley's opening goal led to the game being suspended for 25 minutes as fighting spilled onto the pitch. Derby County were willing to lend Gresley their recently vacated Baseball Ground until the required standards could be met but this was rejected by the footballing authorities. This disappointment of not being promoted to the Football Conference saw many Gresley players leave the club. Manager, Paul Futcher, also left and replacement Garry Birtles (former Assistant Manager) could only achieve a bottom half finish in 1997–98.

Relegation struck in 1998-99 during a season that saw Gresley collapse from a top six position in December.

Elvis Gresley, the club's mascot

The season started well with 13 points and third place in September. Gresley went close to causing an FA Cup 1st-round upset against Walsall in November and victories over King's Lynn and Hastings Town got December off to a fine start. Rovers still sat in sixth by New Year but six successive defeats in January saw them slump to 17th place. In February two successive draws and three defeats led to the dismissal of Manager Garry Birtles, and Stuart Ford taking temporary charge. Ford ended the rout of fourteen games without a win against Atherstone United (2–1) before Brian Kenning was appointed permanent manager in March 1999. The opening game of April produced a comfortable 3–0 victory over Cambridge City but then followed by three defeats against Nuneaton Borough, Crawley Town and Rothwell Town. Vital games at Dorchester Town and Salisbury City yielded only one point. The defeat on the final day against Bath City pushed Gresley into the Midlands Division just two years after being crowned Premier Division by 11 points. The last time Gresley had been relegated was in the 1958–59 season (from the Birmingham League Division One to Division Two.)

=== Reformation ===
After financial difficulties, Gresley Rovers liquidated at the end of the 2008–09 season, forming a new football club, Gresley F.C. In the 2009–10 season, they were placed in the East Midlands Counties League. After finishing their first season in second place they went one better by winning it in 2010–11. The following season they also won the Midland Football Alliance earning a place at Step 4 of the pyramid.

In the 2013–14 season, Gresley finished 9th in the Northern Premier League Division One South. In the following season, Gresley F.C. achieved their biggest ever league win, 10–0 at home to Brigg Town on 13 September 2014. However, a week later manager Martin Rowe resigned for personal reasons. After a successful Caretaker Manager reign, Wayne Thornhill took charge with hopes to reach the play-offs by the end of the season. The 2014–15 season also saw Gresley go on their best Derbyshire Senior Cup run since reformation, finishing runners up and knocking out holders Ilkeston. The Moatmen reached the play-off semi-finals in 2014-15 but lost narrowly away to Leek Town.

In pre-season, the Moatmen lost key players Mitch Hanson and Kieran O'Connell to long-term injuries and several influential players left the club including Eric Graves. After a tough start to the 2015-16 campaign, Wayne Thornhill resigned on 22 September 2015. Dave Langston enjoyed a successful interim campaign but could not take on the job full-time due to work commitments. His interim spell lasted until 17 October when Scott Goodwin took charge. Scott Goodwin achieved one win and six losses in his short tenure at the club and was relieved of his duties on 5 December 2015. Between 28 November and 26 January, the Moatmen had no home league games due to numerous postponements. Gary Ricketts immediately took over as Player/Manager with Dave Langston appointed as assistant. His tenure started in promising fashion, with a victory over Mickleover Sports booking the Moatmen a semi-final berth in the Derbyshire Senior Cup and five straight home NPL Division One victories - their best run of the season - giving them faint hopes of a play-off push. Gresley had a thin squad due to the loss of income the postponements brought and were also playing twice a week most weeks from February to the end of the season. A lot of the re-arranged home games were on Tuesday nights meaning attendances fell but this was also due to poor form. A run of nine straight losses came in March, as injuries, suspensions and availability issues - as well as some below-par displays - took their toll, Gresley eventually ending the season in 16th place. On 23 May 2016, Gary Ricketts resigned for personal reasons and Dave Langston left the club to become manager of Lichfield City.

For the 2016–17 season the main stand was renamed after Pat Murray, a local councillor, as he agreed to donate £1,500 to the club. Pre-season saw the departure of the two best performing 2015-16 players as voted by supporters. Supporters player of the year runner-up Jack Langston and the Supporters' player-of-the-year John Guy both moved to Belper Town to join up with former Moatmen Eric Graves, Alex Steadman, Jordan Ball, Kyle Bryant, Luke Edwards and Bradley Wells. On 10 June 2016, Gresley appointed, former St. Kitts and Nevis international, Damion Beckford-Quailey as their new manager. Damion named Hannah Dingley as his assistant manager and Brian Quailey and Chris Cowan as coaches. Further players departed the club including highly rated teenager Ryan King. The 2016–17 season began strong with 16 points from the first 8 games. However, only five wins followed from the next 32 games which lead to influential forwards Pearson Mwanyongo and Tendai Chitiza leaving the club. Damion's side went on a good run in the Derbyshire Senior Cup reaching the final. However, Gresley finished the season in 18th place.

The following pre-season saw star forward Reece Morris leave the club after picking up 4 awards for the 2016–17 season. The 2017–18 season was one to forget for Gresley supporters. Gresley featured towards the bottom of the table all season but they retained their place in the Northern Premier League Division One South with 4 games remaining. The following week saw the chairman, vice chairman and manager all step down with most of the first team squad leaving with 3 matches still to play.

== Stadium ==
The club has played at the Moat Ground since 1909. It has a capacity of 2,400.

=== Average attendances ===
Only First Team league matches are included in the average.

- 2010–2011 - 282
- 2011–2012 - 364
- 2012–2013 - 278
- 2013–2014 - 279
- 2014–2015 - 275
- 2015–2016 - 217
- 2016–2017 - 238
- 2017–2018 - 201
- 2018-2019 - 208
- 2019-2020 - 155
- 2020-2021 - 269
- 2021-2022 - 362
- 2022-2023 - 394
- 2023-2024 - 332
- 2024-2025 - 329
- 2025-2026 - 363
- 2026-2027 -

=== Previous grounds ===
- Mushroom Lane, Albert Village 1882–1885
- Church Street, Church Gresley 1885–1909

== Player awards ==
=== Gresley FC ===
	Players' Player	Manager's Player	Supporters' Player	Top Scorer	Most Man-of-the-Match	Chairman's Player	Directors' Player
2009–10	Royce Turville	Royce Turville	Royce Turville	Brian Woodall	Royce Turville and Jamie Barrett	N/A	N/A
2010–11	Jordi Gough	Jamie Barrett	Brian Woodall	David Blenkinsopp	Jordi Gough	N/A	Gary Hateley
2011–12	Jordi Gough	Rob Spencer	Jordi Gough	Royce Turville and Richard Hanslow	Dean Oliver	James Jepson	Michael Nottingham
2012–13	Jordi Gough	Jamie Barrett	Jordi Gough	Marc Goodfellow	Jordi Gough	Rob Spencer	Michael Nottingham
2013–14	Eric Graves	Eric Graves	Eric Graves	Rob Spencer	Eric Graves and Liam Guest	Mitchell Hanson	Jamie Barrett
2014–15	Kieran O'Connell	Jamie Barrett	Jamie Barrett	Alex Steadman	Jamie Barrett	Jack Langston	Mitchell Hanson
2015–16	Matt Roome	Matt Roome	John Guy	Gary Ricketts and Martin Smyth	Ryan King	Jake Carlisle	Jack Langston
2016–17	Reece Morris	Josh Egginton	Reece Morris	Reece Morris and Keenan King	Matt Melbourne	Matt Melbourne	Reece Morris

=== Gresley Rovers ===
	Player's Player	Manager's Player	Supporters' Player	Top Scorer	Young Player of the Season	Most Man-of-the-Match
2021-22	Alex Morris	Mason Frizelle	Steve Hart	Steve Hart	George Clark	Steve Hart
2022-23	Alex Morris	Albert Lansdowne	Lewis Fenney	James Spruce and Kane Lee	Dylan Hunniford	Lewis Fenney and Michael Williams
2023-24	Josh Eggington	Jack Tyson	Dylan Hunniford	Kane Lee	Nathan Banton	Josh Waldram
2024-25	Nathan Banton	Nathan Banton	Dylan Hunniford	Jenson Cooper	Phil Kowalski	Dylan Hunniford and Jenson Cooper
2025-26	Albert Lansdowne	Ash Garner	Ash Garner	Sam Moore	Evan Wynne	N/A

== Records ==
=== Gresley FC ===
- Best FA Cup performance: 3rd qualifying round (2012–13)
- Best FA Trophy performance: 1st round (2013–14)
- Best FA Vase performance: Quarter-finals (2009–10)

=== Gresley Rovers ===
- Best FA Cup performance: 1st round (1930–31)
- Best FA Trophy performance: 4th round (1995–96) (2001–02)
- Best FA Vase performance: Runners-up (1990–91)

== Honours ==
=== Gresley FC ===
- East Midlands Counties League
  - Champions: 2010–11
- Midland Football Alliance
  - Champions: 2011–12
- Derbyshire Senior Cup
  - Runners Up: 2014–15, 2016–17

=== Gresley Rovers ===
- Bass Charity Vase
  - Winners: 1911, 1929, 1931, 1949, 1950, 1967, 1989
- Central Alliance
  - Premier Division Champions: 1964–65, 1966–67
  - Cup Winners: 1952–53
- Coalville Charity Cup
  - Winners 1946–47
- Derbyshire Senior Cup
  - Winners: 1987–88, 1988–89, 1989–90, 1990–91, 1993–94, 1995–96, 1996–97, 2004–05
  - Runners Up: 1956–57, 1969–70, 1999–2000, 2001–02
- East Midlands Regional League
  - Champions: 1967–68, 1969–70
- FA Vase
  - Runners Up: 1990–91
- Leicestershire Senior League
  - Champions: 1900–01
  - Runners-up: 1898–99, 1911–12, 1915–16, 1937–38, 1938–39, 1941–42
  - Central Division Champions: 1946–47, 1947–48
  - Division One Runners-up: 1948–49
- Leicestershire Senior Cup
  - Winners: 1946–47, 1988–99
- Millennium Cup
  - Winners: 1999–2000
- Southern Football League
  - Premier Division Champions: 1996–97
  - League Cup Runners Up: 1993–94
  - Midland Division Runners Up: 1992–93
- United Counties League
  - Premier Division North Runners Up: 2021–22
- West Midlands League
  - Champions: 1990–91, 1991–92
  - Runners Up: 1985–86, 1988–89
  - League Cup Winners: 1988–89
  - League Cup Runners Up: 1986–87, 1991–92
