= Wisewood =

Area of Sheffield, South Yorkshire, England

Coordinates: 53.4058°N 1.5201°W

Wisewood is a suburb of the city of Sheffield in South Yorkshire, England and situated 2 3/4 miles (4.4 km) north-west of the city centre. It is a residential suburb consisting almost exclusively of council housing, some of which has been bought by tenants under the right to buy scheme. It is bordered by the adjacent suburbs of Loxley, Wadsley, Malin Bridge and Hillsborough (in whose ward the suburb is situated).

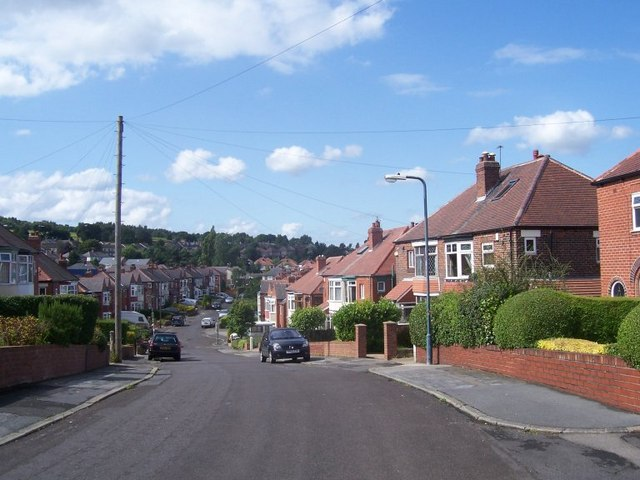
Laird Avenue

== Location ==
The original location of Wisewood was in the Loxley valley just before the river reached Malin Bridge and it is still shown as such on the 1:25,000 scale Ordnance Survey map. The former industrial sites of Wisewood Forge and Wisewood Rolling Mills are situated in the Loxley valley as is Wisewood Cemetery. However, the name was adopted for a new housing estate built in the early 1930s higher up the hillside and overlooking the valley. People have questioned over the years why the estate was called Wisewood when it was closer to Wadsley. The houses on the lower part of the estate are close to the original location of Wisewood.

== History ==
Prior to the 1920s, the Wisewood area was a rural location of mostly farmers' fields. There were scattered small cottages and farm buildings with the population employed as farm labourers, quarrymen, steelworkers, ganister miners or in the manufacturing of pocketknifes.

Wisewood was transformed in the late 1920s when Sheffield City Council made the decision in 1928 to build a large housing estate there. At a council meeting on 4 April 1928 a compulsory purchase order was issued to purchase just over 80 acres (32 ha) of land for the building of the new council estate. Most of the land belonged to Tingle's Farm and Flander's Farm, now both demolished.

The land was bounded by Ben Lane to the north, Wisewood Road and Hibberd Place to the south, Dykes Lane to the east and Studfield Hill to the west. A total of £17,300 was paid to the landowners as compensation. On 7 November 1931, the final house on the Wisewood estate was completed and handed over to the new owner. The estate consisted of 901 dwellings and was built at an approximate cost of £400,000.

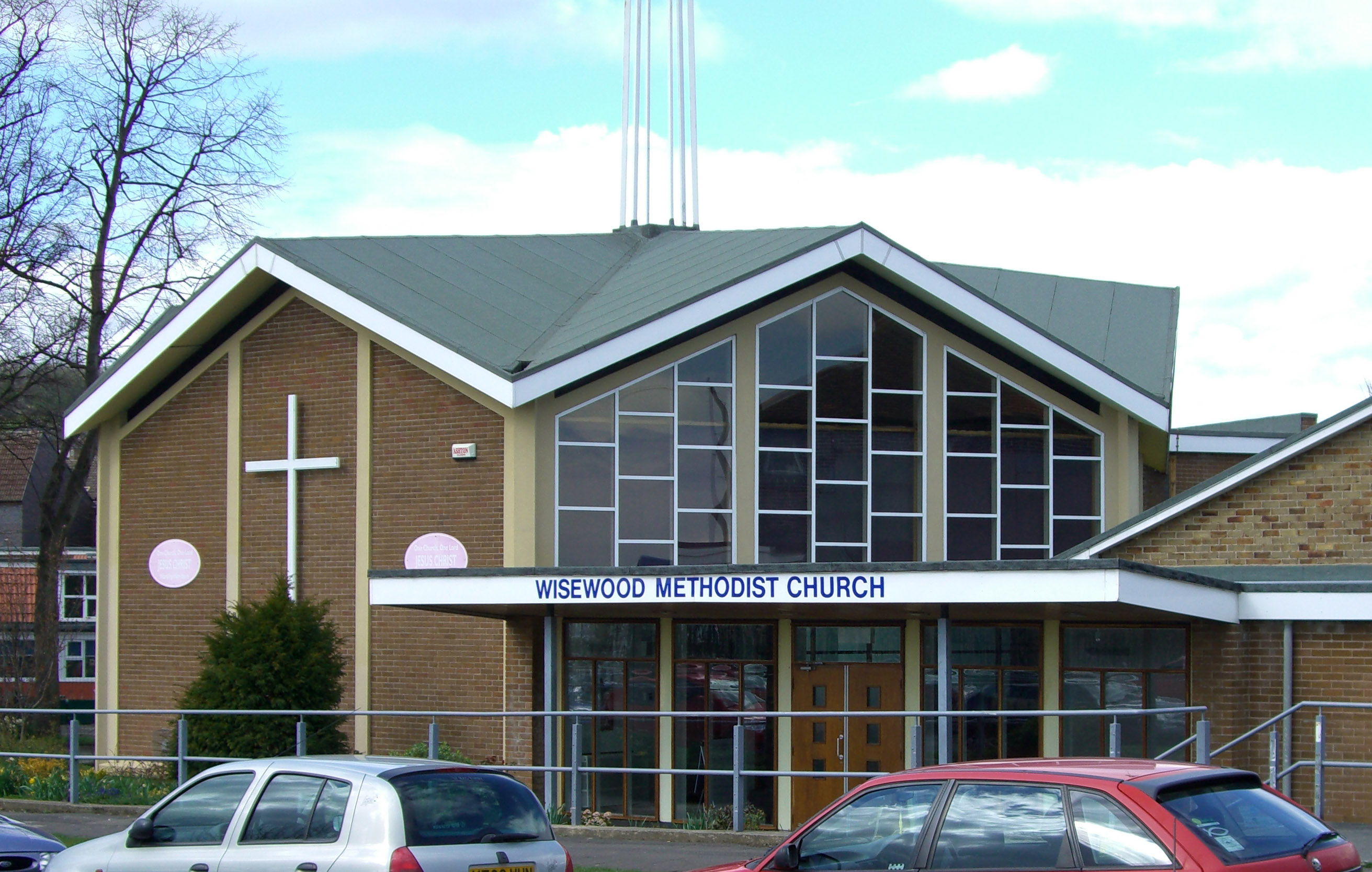
Wisewood Methodist Church.

== Amenities and landmarks ==
A site for a primary and secondary school to serve the estate was purchased by the council in 1927 at the junction of Ben Lane and Rural Lane at a cost of £1,350. Construction began in early 1929 with the junior school opening on 11 January 1932 at a cost of £17,000. The school originally accommodated 480 children; today it has a capacity of approximately 165. The secondary school was officially opened on 7 September 1933; it later changed its name to the Wisewood School and Community Sports College. The school was closed in the summer of 2011 and demolished in March 2012; a new artificial grass pitch was built on the site of the school and has been integrated into the newly set up Wisewood Sports Centre. The school was merged with Myers Grove School which was also demolished to form the new Forge Valley School on Wood Lane at Malin Bridge.

In 1930, a row of shops was constructed across the road from the schools on the site of a drained pond; these still serve the estate today and include a post office, grocers, etc. The foundation stone for Wisewood Methodist Church was laid on 4 April 1970; this church in a modern style has an adjoining community hall. Dial House stands on Ben Lane; it was a country house for many years being so named because it had a sun dial over the front door. It became The Dial House Social Club in the 1930s, finally closing in 2005. It is a grade II listed building and has now been integrated into a new development of apartments and houses.

The only recreation area within Wisewood is the locally named Spider Park, a grassy area with very few facilities; the local community are lobbying the council to upgrade the park and provide improved amenities. One of the largest structures in Wisewood, which often goes unnoticed, is a reinforced concrete covered reservoir just off Ben Lane, it holds 4 million gallons of water and measures 75 by 60 yards (69 by 55 m).
