= Malin Bridge =

Suburb of Sheffield, South Yorkshire, England

Coordinates: 53.4003°N 1.5107°W

- Location within South Yorkshire
- OS grid reference: SK325893
- Metropolitan borough: Sheffield
- Metropolitan county: South Yorkshire
- Region: Yorkshire and the Humber
- Country: England
- Sovereign state: United Kingdom
- Post town: SHEFFIELD
- Postcode district: S6
- Dialling code: 0114
- Police: South Yorkshire
- Fire: South Yorkshire
- Ambulance: Yorkshire
- UK Parliament: Sheffield Brightside and Hillsborough; Sheffield Central; Sheffield Hallam

Malin Bridge is a suburb of the city of Sheffield, England. It is located at grid reference SK325893 and stands 2 1/2 miles north-west of the city centre where the rivers Loxley and Rivelin meet. Malin Bridge is only a small district centred on the road bridge over the River Loxley which carries the B6076 road to Stannington (in whose ward the suburb lies); it is surrounded by the suburbs of Hillsborough, Wisewood, Walkley and Stannington.

== History ==
The origin of the name Malin Bridge is obscure and several possible meanings have been put forward. The most probable is that the name derived from Malin Stacie, who was Lord of the Manor of Owlerton (which lies three-quarters of a mile to the north-east) between 1607 and 1652. It is possible that Stacie built the bridge or was responsible for its upkeep and it was therefore named after him. Another possibility is that the name derives from Milne Bridge, a common occurrence where a bridge is built near a mill. A third option is that it was named after "mellum" an old word that relates to stones in the bed of a river.

=== Origins ===
Malin Bridge came into existence because of the strategic importance of the bridge over the Loxley with a small population consisting of publican, wheelwright, blacksmith and saddler springing up in the immediate area to serve the travellers who used the bridge. In the first half of the 18th century grinding mills and water-powered forges started to be built in the area to harness the power of the rivers. The best known of these are the Malin Bridge Corn Mill which still stands today and the Mousehole Forge which dates from the 17th century and was a world-famous anvil producer in its heyday.

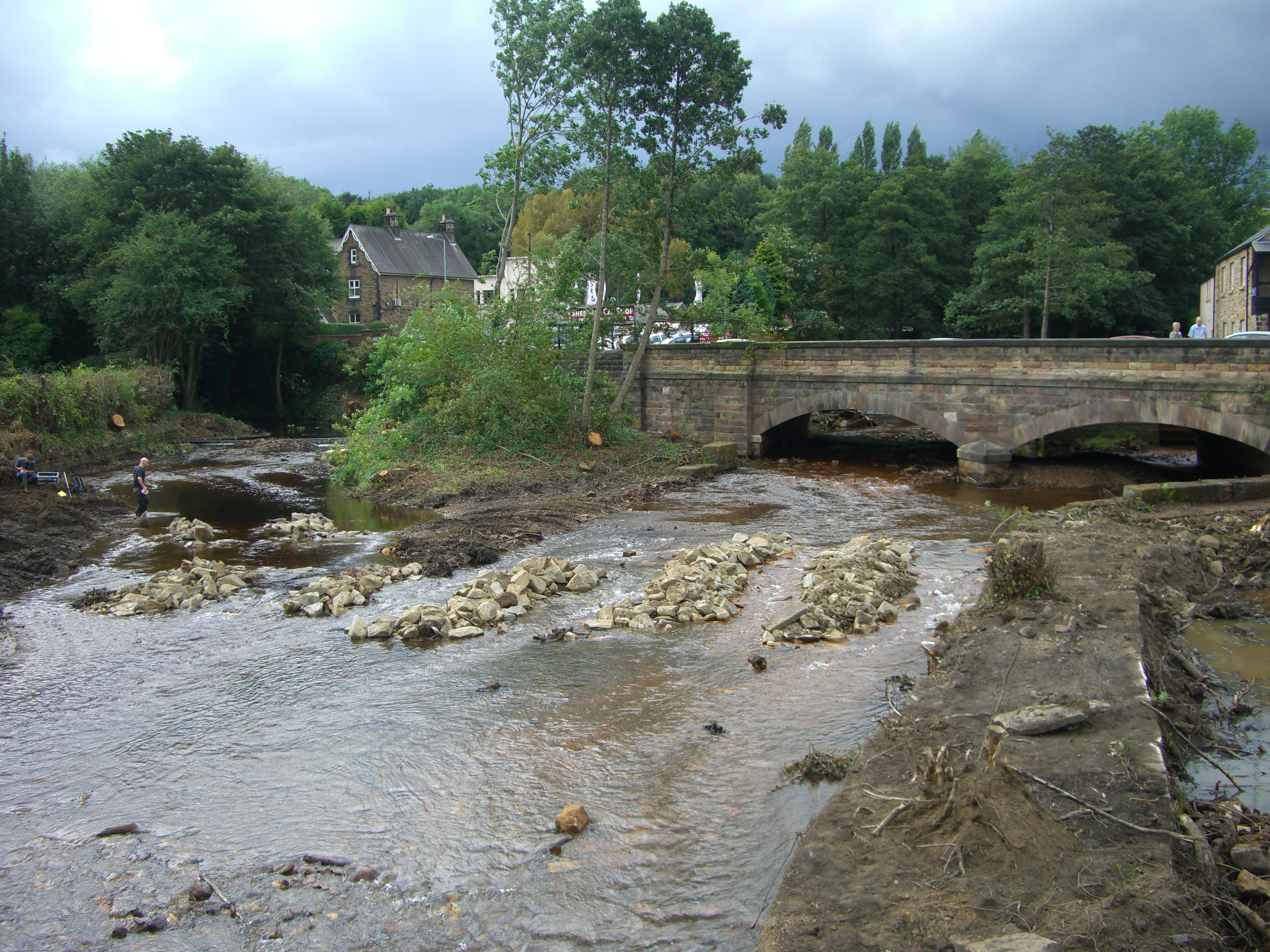
Malin Bridge and the confluence of the Rivers Rivelin and Loxley after flood management work in August 2009.

=== The Great Sheffield Flood ===
In 1864 Malin Bridge was devastated by the Great Sheffield Flood with 102 people killed and 20 houses destroyed in the area. Whole families were wiped out with eleven people killed at the Stag Inn including eight members of the Armitage family as the inn was swept away. Seven members of the Bisby family were killed as the Cleakum Inn was inundated and swept away. The stone-built bridge was also carried off by the raging torrent and many of the industrial workshops were destroyed. Samuel Harrison wrote: "The populous village of Malin Bridge experienced the full fury of the flood, and suffered to an extent which is truly appalling...A bombardment with the newest and most powerful artillery could hardly have proved so destructive, and could not possibly have been nearly so fatal to human life."

Malin Bridge expanded with the building of Victorian terraced housing; it became a terminus for the Sheffield Tramway with a route from the city centre commencing on 19 May 1908. Buses could be then caught at Malin Bridge for travellers continuing to Bradfield or Stannington. At that time Malin Bridge was a busy shopping area and increasing traffic meant that the original narrow bridge over the Loxley to Stannington was replaced by a wider and stronger structure. The tram route from the city centre was taken over by buses in 1952, but reinstated in 1995.

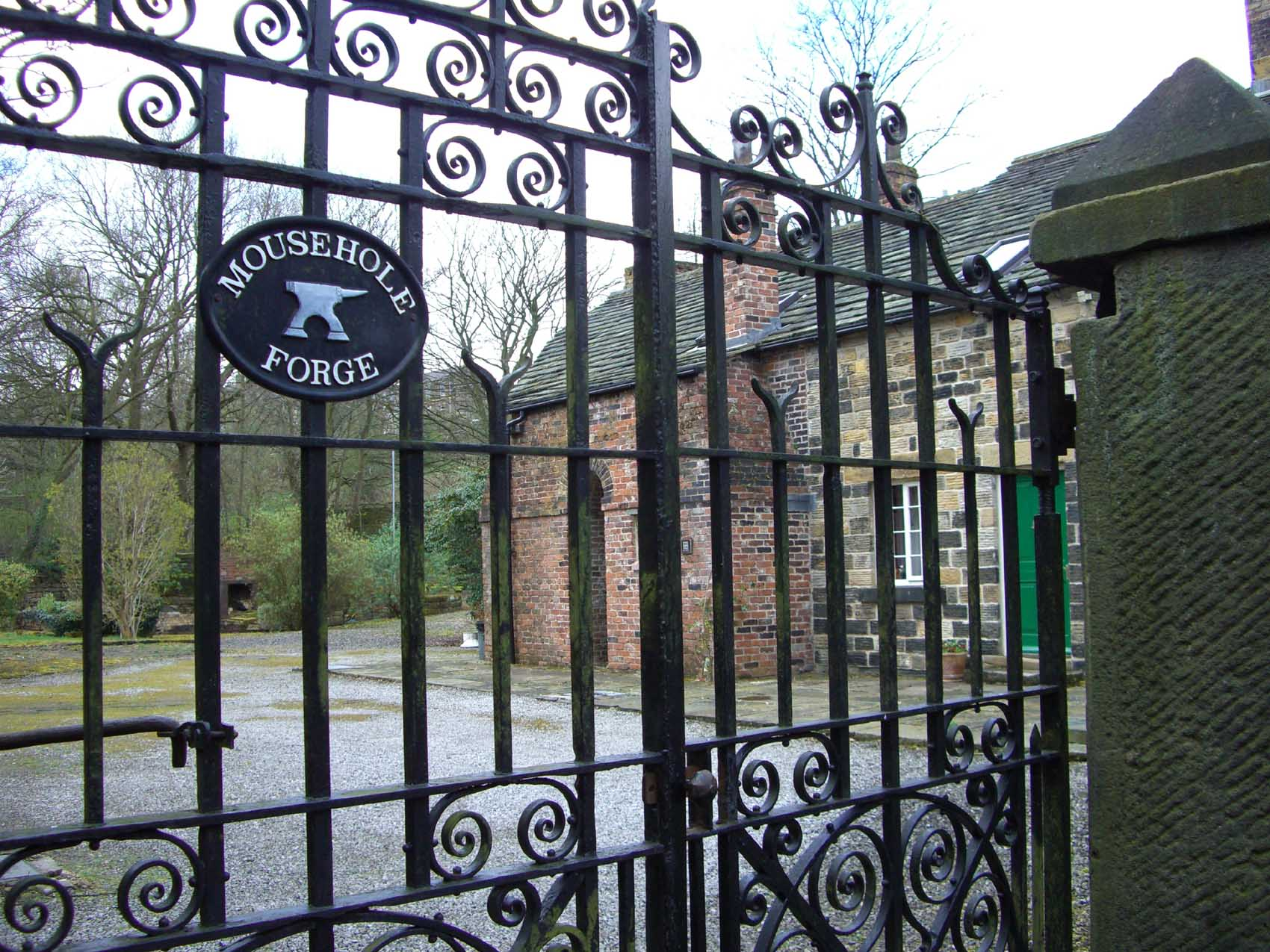
The Mousehole Forge, part of the old buildings has been converted into a private dwelling.

== Present day structures and developments ==
Present-day Malin Bridge is centred on a busy road junction which consists of a one-way traffic loop with various roads leading off. The A6101 (Rivelin Valley Road) leads off to the south-west and after three miles connects to the A57 road which goes to Manchester. Other B class roads leave Malin Bridge for the suburbs of Stannington, Loxley and beyond. There are many small shops around the one-way system; the largest retail outlet in the area is Towsure, a sizeable outdoor equipment warehouse on Holme Lane. The Rivelin Valley fire station stands 200 yards along the Rivelin Valley Road. In June 2021, the German international discount supermarket chain Lidl opened a branch in Malin Bridge at the bottom of Stannington Road on the site of the old Rivelin Motor Company. The new store, which created around 40 new jobs was given the go ahead despite objections from some residents who said it would create traffic chaos in the area.

=== Malin Bridge Corn Mill ===
The grade two listed mill stands at the junction of Stannington Road and Holme Lane. The earliest written records for a mill on this site date from 1739; at that time it was used for grinding knives. It is one of the few remaining examples of an undershot water wheel in the country, it is 20 feet (6 m) in diameter and 8 feet 2 inches (2.5 m) wide. The mill was completely destroyed in the flood of 1864 and was rebuilt by the Wilson family. Around 1915 it was converted to a corn mill by the Marsden family and operated until 1956. Since then it has been a Comet store, Chinese restaurant and a clothing store before becoming disused. In 2006 Sheffield City Council granted permission for 23 new apartments to be built on the site; the plans include strict controls to preserve the historic building and water wheel. The apartments and the restoration were completed in the second half of 2008.

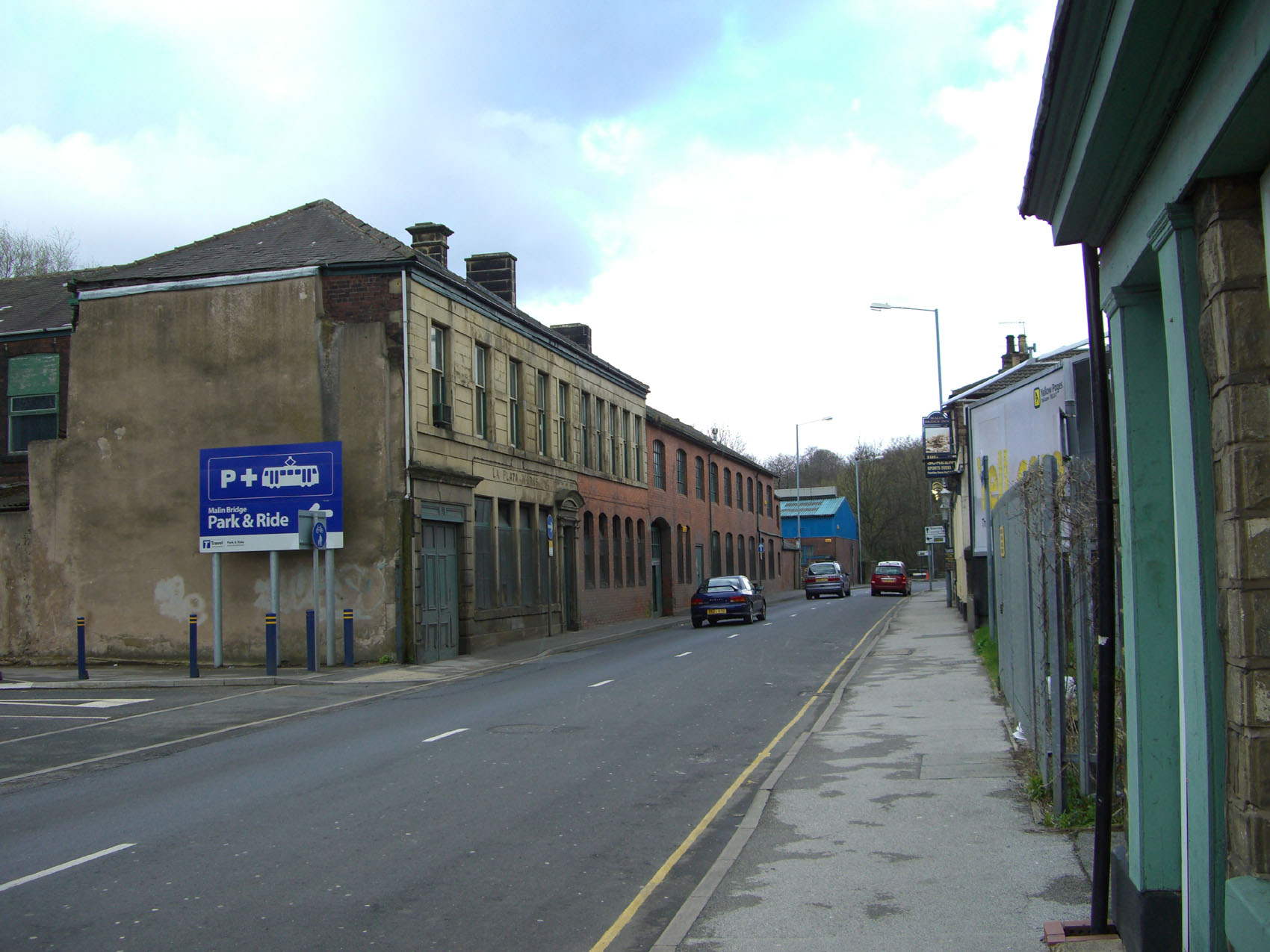
The La Plata works of Burgon & Ball. The entrance to the Supertram park and ride is on the left.

=== Mousehole Forge ===
The Mousehole Forge is situated on the River Rivelin just before it reaches Malin Bridge. It dates from the 1628, pre-dating the industrial revolution and is one of the few surviving water-powered forges in the country. It was famous for producing anvils that were exported all over the world, and it closed around 1933. The works also produced vices and various other engineering tools. Part of the site is a grade two listed building although much of the old machinery is open to the elements. It was a large concern; one of the buildings has now been converted to a private house although a lot of the site is ruined. From the late 1920s to the 1950s a woodworking business, the Malin Bridge Construction Company, occupied one of the other buildings. The importance of the site is emphasised by the fact that a book has been written about the forge by Richard A. Postman.

=== Burgon & Ball ===
Burgon & Ball is an old Sheffield firm which originally made shears, scissors and knives. Its Sheffield origins date back to 1730; they moved to the La Plata Works on Holme Lane in Malin Bridge in 1873. The works were built on the site of a cutlery grinding wheel, which had existed since the 1690s, on land cleared after the 1864 flood. The works stand on the banks of the River Loxley and the river provided much of the power for the works throughout the 1900s. In the latter part of the 19th century the company patented a design for hand sheep shears and in one year sold over 300,000 pairs of shears. By 1920 the firm was producing more garden shears than sheep shears and it has continued to diversify into garden tools over the years. There is still a market for hand sheep shears and the company is now the only British manufacturer.

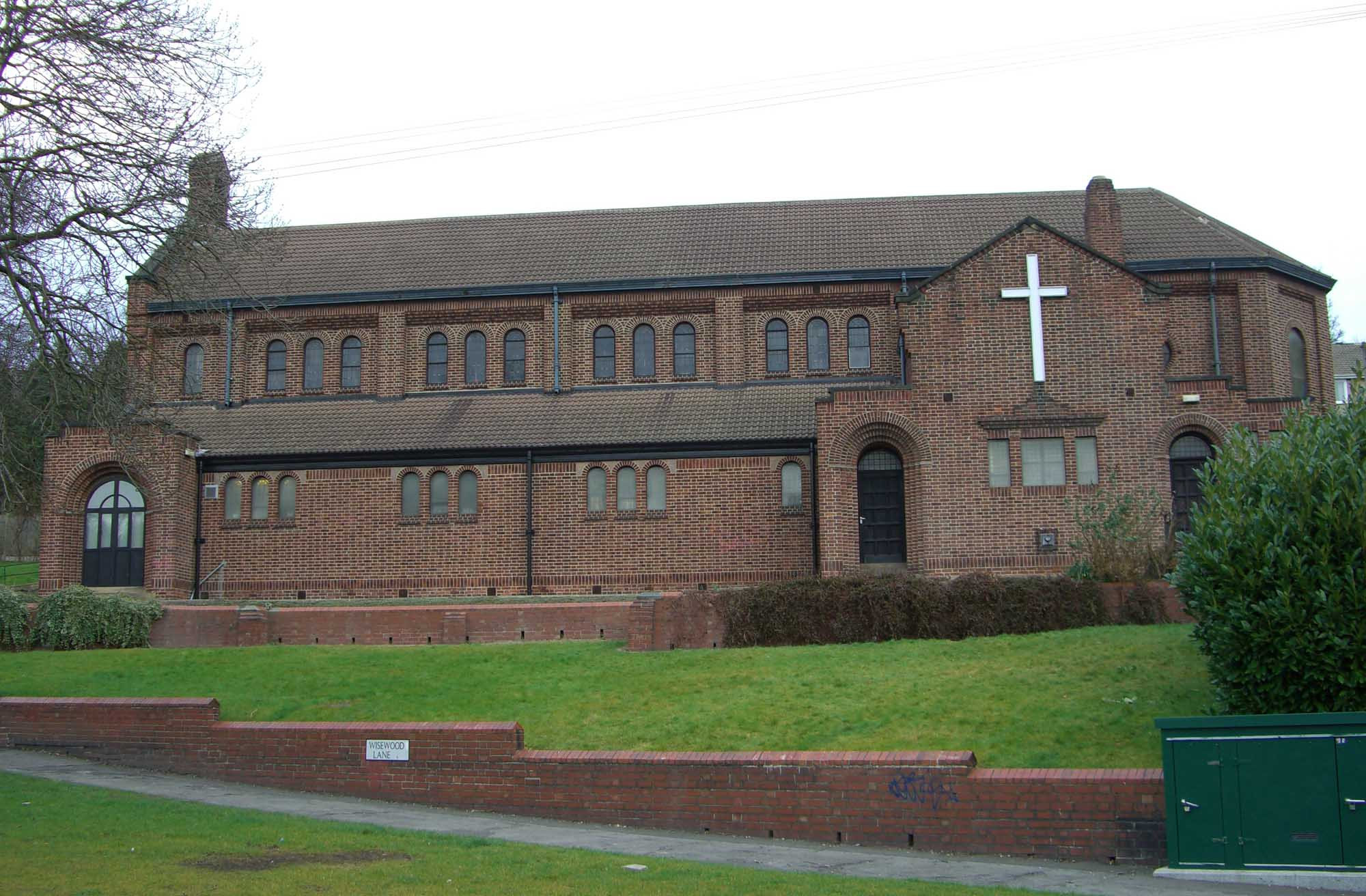
St Polycarp's church

=== St Polycarp's Church, Malin Bridge ===
Originally Malin Bridge was in the parish of Wadsley, however a separate parish was created in 1933 as the population of the area increased. A tin tabernacle had previously been used for worship as the area had no church and fundraising was commenced to build St Polycarp's at the junction of Loxley Road and Wisewood Lane. The foundation stone for the new church was laid by the Bishop of Sheffield and it was built by H.I. Potter of Fowler, Sandford & Potter in 1933–34, the former tin tabernacle remaining in use as the church hall until the 1960s when the new church hall was built adjacent to the church. The church is built of rustic brick with a pantile roof with no tower or spire; windows are grouped in threes. The interior consists of a four bay nave and a broad chancel with a tall arch. A small glazed porch was added in 1992 at the western end.

=== Malin Bridge tram stop ===
Malin Bridge tram stop was constructed as one of the termini of the South Yorkshire Supertram; it is the western limit of the blue line service which runs eastwards to the city centre and then on to Halfway. The terminus was first used on 23 October 1995 and is a single platform stop which is separated from the traffic on the A6101 (Holme Lane). In February 2006 work started on a Park and ride scheme adjacent to the terminus on the opposite side of Holme Lane. The unmanned scheme which cost £500,000 opened in November 2006 providing 104 parking spaces, as well as CCTV cameras and bicycle shelters. The park and ride has not been well used and price cuts have been introduced to encourage people to use the scheme.

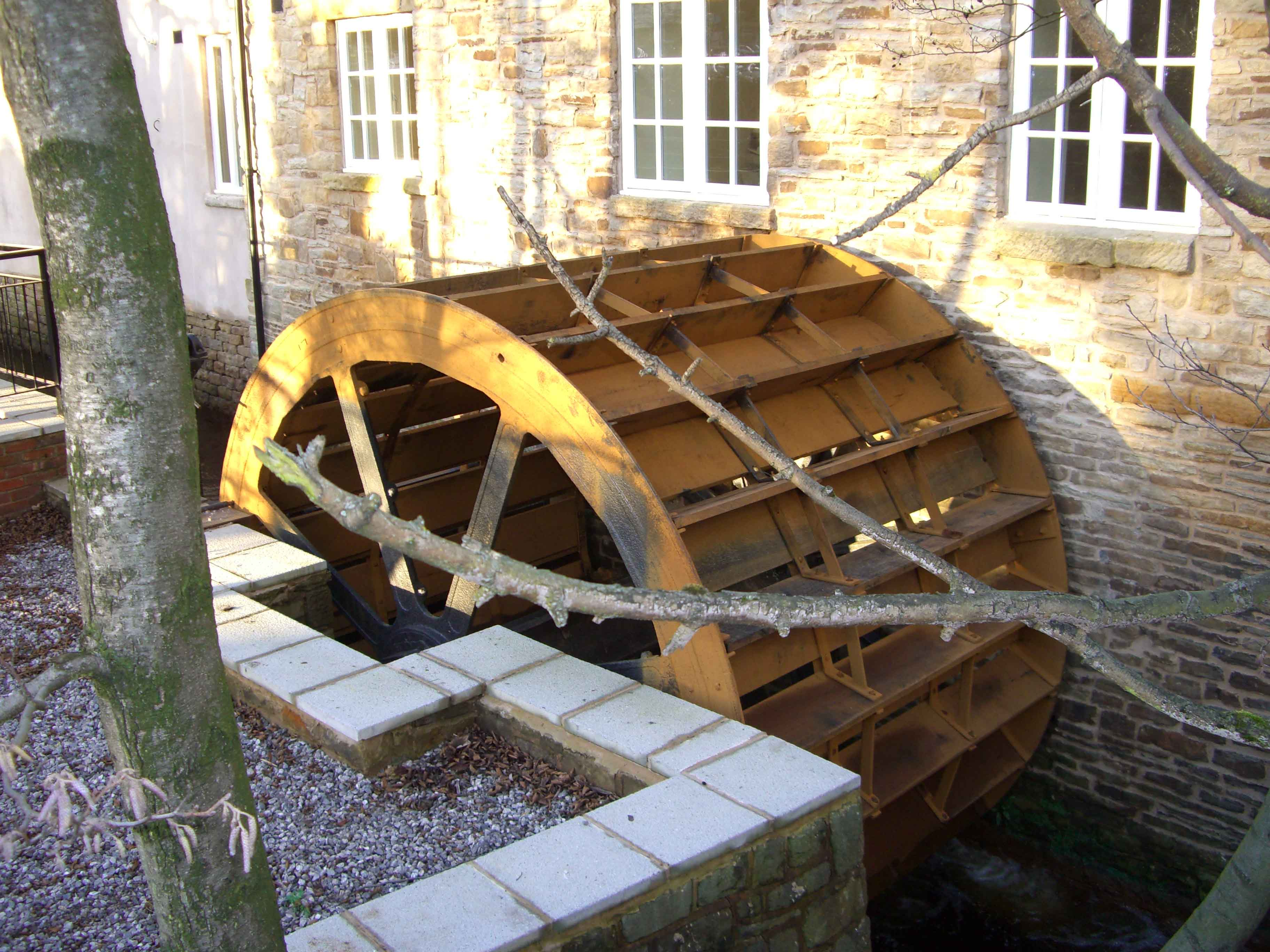
The Malin Bridge corn mill water wheel was fully restored at the end of 2008 along with the redevelopment of the mill into 23 apartments.

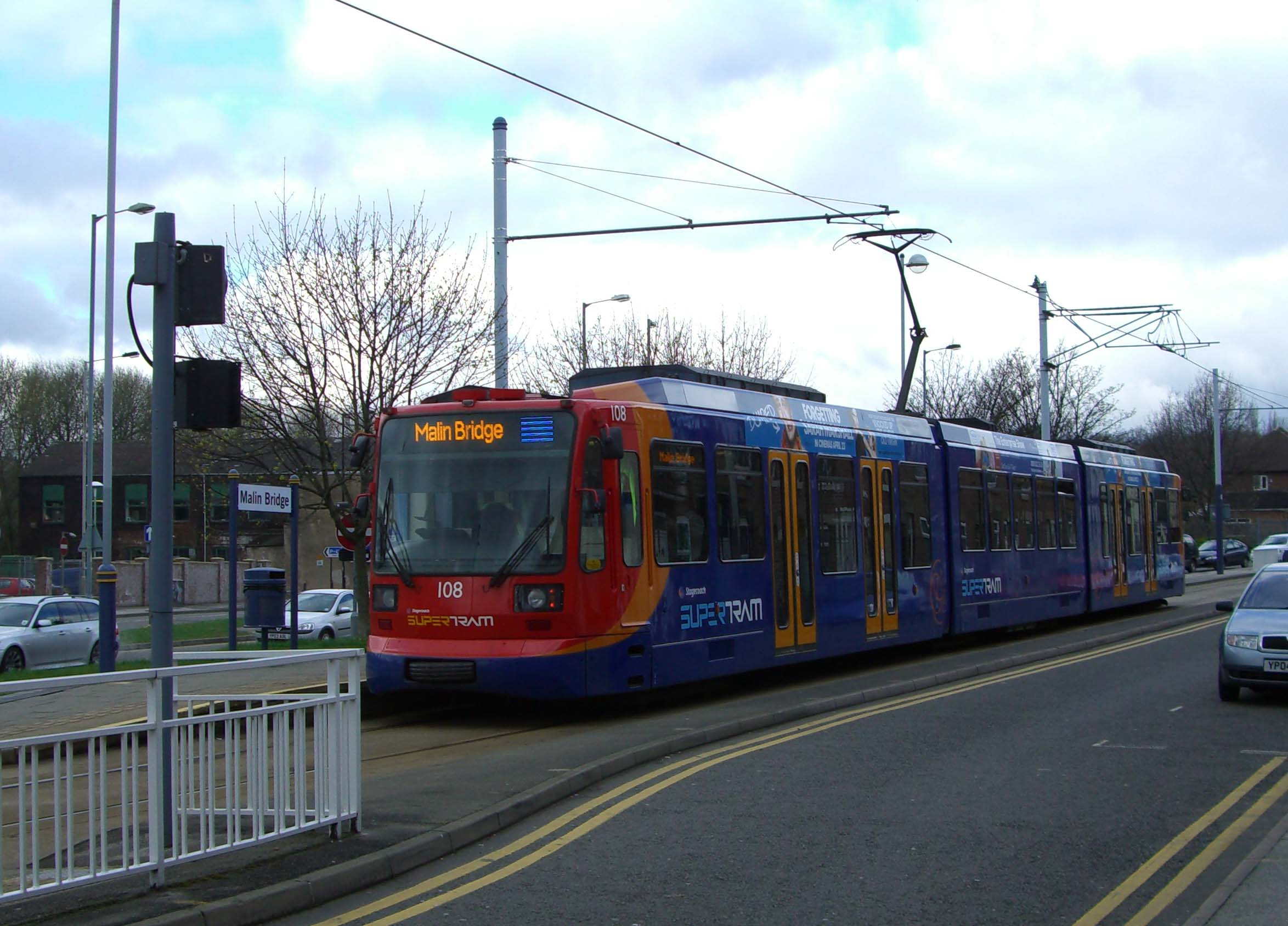
Sheffield Supertram stands at its Malin Bridge terminus.

Preceding station	South Yorkshire Supertram	Following station
Hillsborough Interchange towards Halfway	Blue Line	Terminus

=== Schools ===
There are two schools in the Malin Bridge area, Forge Valley School on Wood Lane opened in September 2011 and replaced Wisewood School & Community Sports College and Myers Grove School. Malin Bridge Primary School is situated on Dykes Lane. Built by H. I. Potter, it was opened in 1905, enlarged in 1910 and has almost 500 pupils.

=== Public houses ===
There are now four public houses in the area. The Loxley formerly known as the Yew Tree Inn, is located at the centre of Malin Bridge. The original pub was destroyed in the 1864 flood and a new building was constructed on the same site; the original structure was used as a makeshift mortuary after the flood. The Anvil on Stannington Road owes its name to the nearby Mousehole Forge which was once one of the world's largest manufacturer of anvils. The present building dates from 1935 and replaced an inn of the same name whose history goes back to 1825. The Holly Bush is also in the general area, just along Rivelin Valley Road, although it is usually said to be in Rivelin Valley rather than Malin Bridge; it dates from 1841. The Malin Bridge Inn dates from 1831; it was completely destroyed in the 1864 flood when it was known as the Cleakum Inn and was rebuilt with its present name after the flood. The Stag Inn, just across the road, was never rebuilt after being turned into a ruin by the flood.

=== Flood management ===
The Malin Bridge area suffered badly in the floods of June 2007. As a result of this the Environment Agency started work in August 2009 to remove trees and silt from the river beds at the confluence of the Loxley and Rivelin rivers at Malin Bridge. The work will alleviate flooding problems in the future but has had the added effect of opening up the views of the area with the confluence of the two rivers now clearly in view, something that has not been seen for many years. In September 2014 Sheffield City Council announced plans to construct a dam wall upstream in the Rivelin valley at one of two possible locations to create a flood storage area. In either case the dam will be over 36-foot (11 m) high with a 13-foot (4.0 m) wide crest. If the scheme goes ahead, it will reduce the depth of water downstream by 4 feet 11 inches (1.50 m) during heavy rain such as those that occurred in 2007 flood.
