= Dial House, Sheffield =

Grade II listed house in Sheffield, England

Coordinates: 53.4077338°N 1.5124635°W

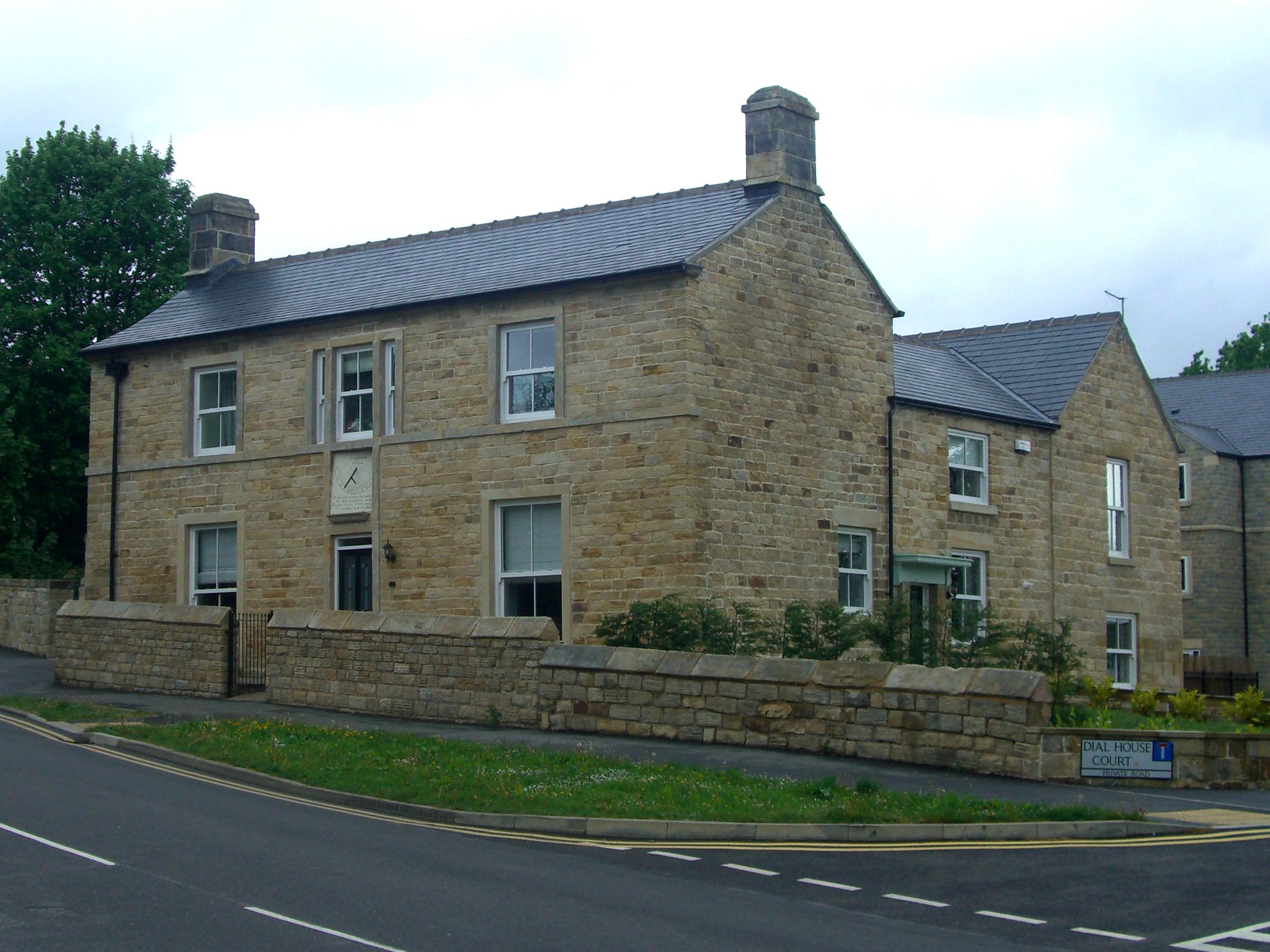
In 2015, restored and part of a modern housing development.

Dial House is a Grade II listed building located on Ben Lane in the Wisewood area of the City of Sheffield in England. The house was originally a private small country house, before becoming a working men's club and more recently part of a development of modern apartments.

== History ==
=== Private house ===
The house was constructed in 1802. It consists of two storeys with a three window range and is built from squared stone with a stone slate roof. The house had various additions and alterations to it in the 19th and 20th centuries. The front door has a square panel above with a vertical sundial attached, this has the date 1802 and the name Coopland on it. It is not known if Coopland were the first family to live in the house or were the makers of the sundial. There is also a verse on the sundial which reads:

“Of shade and sunshine for each hour,
See here a measure made,
Then wonder not if life consists
Of sunshine and of shade.”

The Ordnance Survey map of 1850 shows Dial House in a rural location well outside the town of Sheffield before its industrial expansion. It stood about one kilometre to the west of the village of Wadsley in an area that included the other country houses of Dykes Hall and Wadsley Hall. The first known occupant of the hall was William Rotherham, a gentleman who lived in the house between 1841 and 1845.

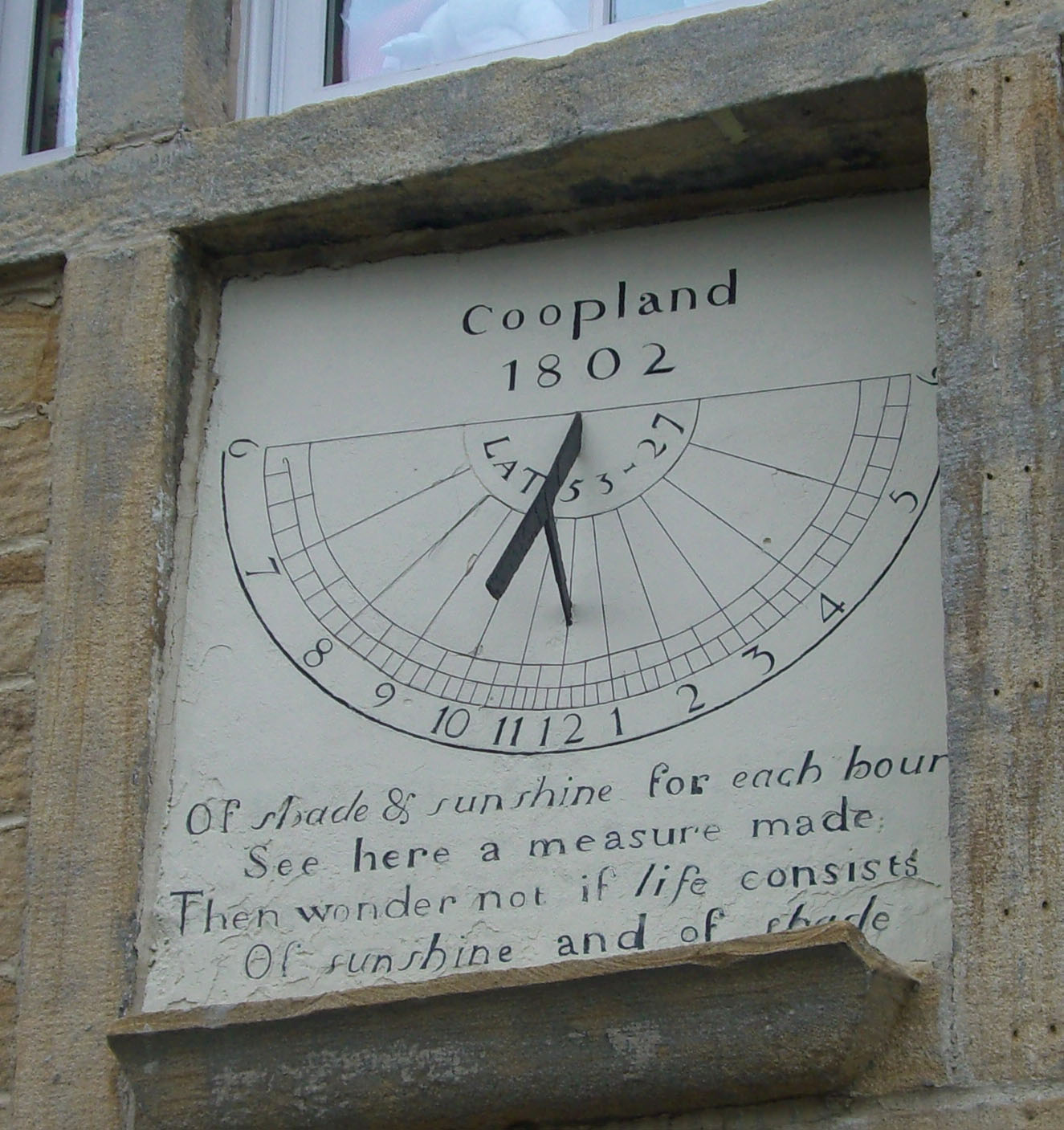
The sundial above the front door.

In 1845 the house was occupied by Sidney Roberts (1804–1859), a silversmith and silver plater who lived there with his wife Sarah and their two sons John and Augustus. Sidney Roberts had been a partner in the silversmith business of Roberts, Smith & Co. of Park Grange, Sheffield between 1826 and 1836, however by the time he came to live at Dial House at the age of 41 he was listed as a retired silver plater and a gentleman of independent means. The family's elder son John Shearwood Roberts, a GP and surgeon inherited the house in 1856 although it seems that he did not reside at Dial House as his mother lived there until 1868, just before her death. Subsequent occupants included Captain Henry T. Holmes (1868–1871) who was followed by William Haden, Gentleman, who was a corn miller employing 8 men at the time of the 1881 census and sometime churchwarden to nearby Wadsley Parish Church. He died on 12 December 1887, by which point of time he had been received as a Gentleman, according to his Probate record. He was the nephew and one of the beneficiaries of the will of John Haden of Holywell House, Swinton, Yorkshire, Gentleman. In 1910 Arthur James Blanchard owner of a well known local clothing and furniture department store on Infirmary Road moved into Dial House and lived there until 1919. Blanchard became Lord Mayor of Sheffield in 1923. John Woodcock Hemmings was the final resident of Dial House as a private residence between 1919 and 1932.

=== Working men's club ===
In 1927 Dykes Hall, which stood 400 metres to the south of Dial House, was demolished and much of its land along with that of Wadsley Hall was used to construct a new housing estate known as the “Sutton Estate” built by the William Sutton Housing Trust. Dial House lost its rural tranquillity and was suddenly surrounded by the Sheffield housing suburbs of Wisewood and Wadsley. In 1932 Dial House was purchased by Charles Goodison and a group of 25 individuals and the Dial House Social Club and Institute was opened as a working men's club. In its early days the club was also known informally as the Sundial Club. The club had a concert room, bowling green, billiard room, cricket pitch and a football team, in 1939 the club had 50 paying members and by 1964 it had 2,400 members including 800 ladies. The club was very popular in the 1960s through to the 1980s and had a large financial turnover. During that time some of Sheffield's best known entertainment talents played there, including: Tony Christie, Dave Berry, Joe Cocker, Marti Caine, Bobby Knutt and Def Leppard. The Dial House club went into decline and finally closed in 2005 due to financial difficulties.

=== Modern developments ===
In 2013 Dial House and its surrounding land was purchased by the Sheffield construction company Campbell Homes Ltd and has been incorporated into a new housing development known as Dial House Court. The original house has been turned into three cottages while new building work has created 33 two bedroom apartments in total with communal gardens.
