= Adam Johnson (cricketer) =

English cricketer

Personal information
- Full name: Adam Hugh Vyvyan Johnson
- Born: 28 November 1978 (age 47); Sheffield, Yorkshire, England
- Batting: Right-handed
- Bowling: Wicket-keeper

Domestic team information
- Years: Team
- 1999: Cambridgeshire
- 2001: Cambridge MCCU
- 2001: Cambridge University

Career statistics
Competition	First-class
Matches	4
Runs scored	72
Batting average	18.00
100s/50s	–/1
Top score	55*
Catches/stumpings	5/–
- Source: Cricinfo, 19 July 2019

Adam Hugh Vyvyan Johnson (born 28 November 1978) is an English former first-class cricketer.

Johnson was born at Sheffield in November 1978. He was educated at Tapton School, before going up to Jesus College, Cambridge. While studying at Cambridge, he made his debut in first-class cricket for Cambridge UCCE against Kent at Fenner's in 2001. He made three further first-class appearances in 2001, playing twice more for Cambridge UCCE and once for Cambridge University against Oxford University. In his four first-class matches, he scored 72 runs with a high score of 55 not out. In addition to playing first-class cricket he also played minor counties cricket for Cambridgeshire in 1999, making a single appearance in the Minor Counties Championship.
