= Wadsley =

Suburb of Sheffield, England

Coordinates: 53.41°N 1.52°W

- Suburb
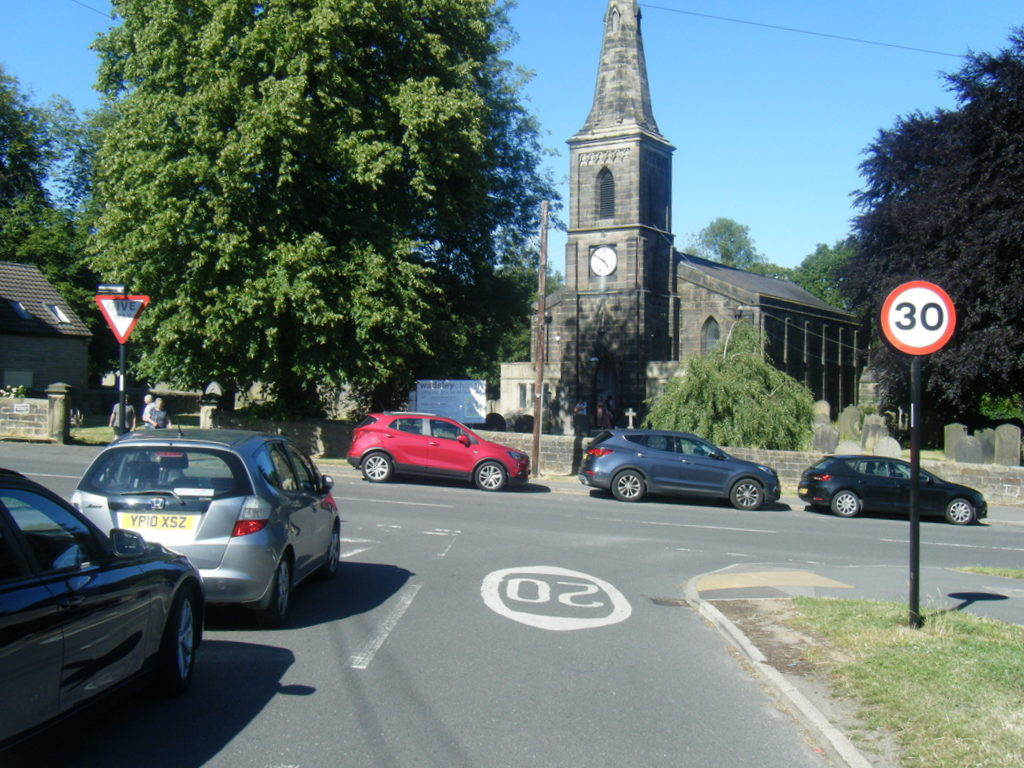
- Wadsley Church

- Location within South Yorkshire
- Population: 5,631
- OS grid reference: SK321905
- Metropolitan borough: Sheffield
- Metropolitan county: South Yorkshire
- Region: Yorkshire and the Humber
- Country: England
- Sovereign state: United Kingdom
- Post town: SHEFFIELD
- Postcode district: S6
- Dialling code: 0114
- Police: South Yorkshire
- Fire: South Yorkshire
- Ambulance: Yorkshire
- UK Parliament: Sheffield Brightside and Hillsborough

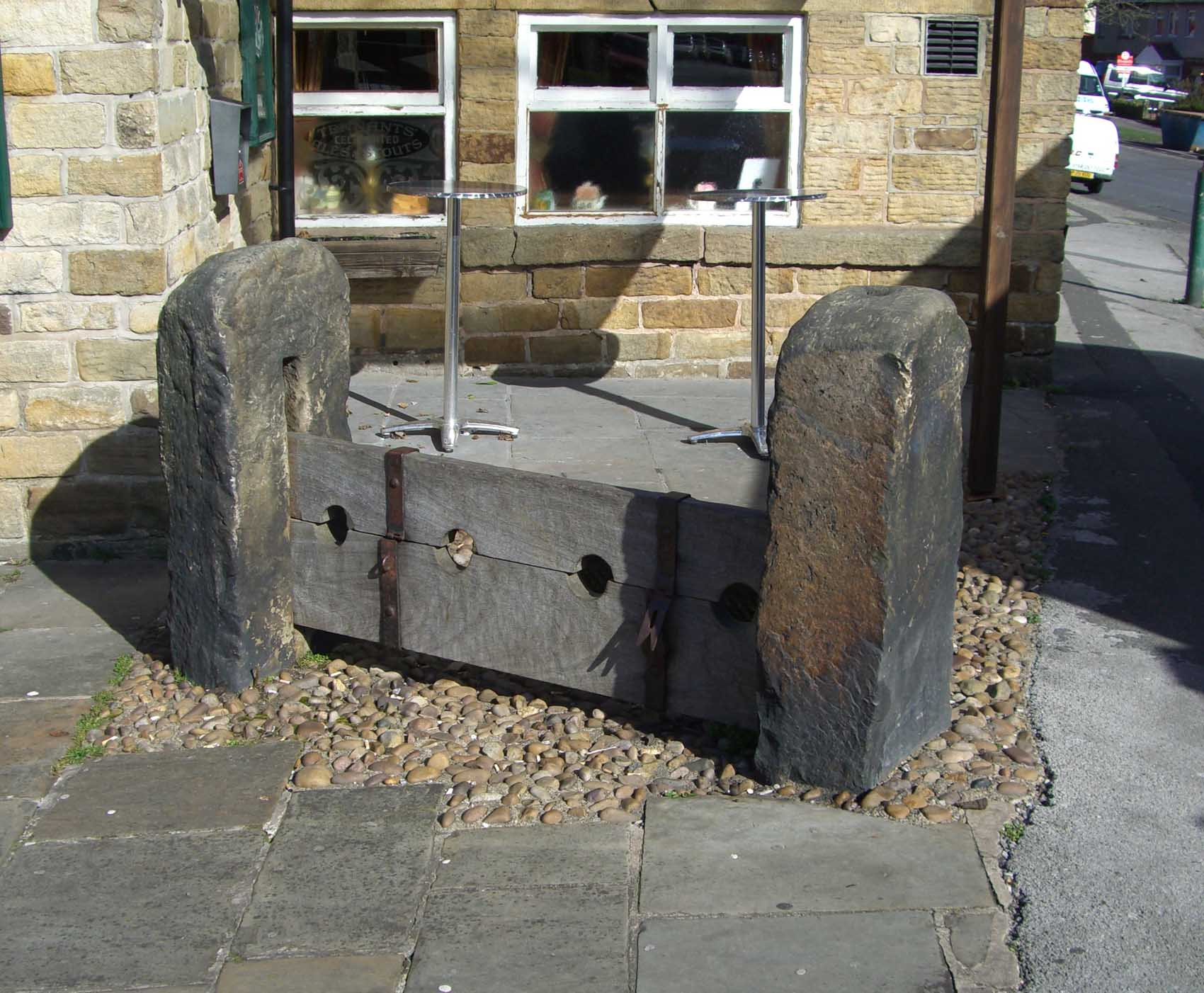
The medieval stocks still stand outside the Wadsley Jack pub, they are a grade two listed monument.

Wadsley is a suburb of the City of Sheffield in South Yorkshire, England. It stands 3 miles (5 km) north-west of the city centre at an approximate grid reference of SK321905. At the 2011 Census the suburb fell within the Hillsborough ward of the City. Wadsley was formerly a rural village which was engulfed by the expansion of Sheffield in the early part of the 20th century.

== History ==
The origin of the name Wadsley is thought to come from a personal or mythological name, possibly Wad, Wadde, Wade or Wada, in conjunction with the Old English word "leah" which means an open space or glade in a wood. A feudal manorial system existed in Wadsley in the Early Middle Ages under the control of Aldene. The Anglo-Saxon estate of Wadesleah is recorded in the Domesday Book of 1086 in its genitive form of Wadesleia. After the Norman conquest of England Waltheof, the last of the Saxon lords retained Hallamshire of which Wadsley was a part; however he was beheaded in 1076 for rebellion against William the Conqueror and his lands passed to his wife Judith of Lens, with Roger de Busli, first Lord of Hallamshire, holding power.

Wadsley eventually became a manor under the control of the De Wadsley family; they were a knightly family of some power in southern Yorkshire. The family had manorial rights and built a manor hall, a deer park and chapel within the parish of Ecclesfield. Their surname was first recorded in 1227, there are still Wadsleys today. The ownership of the manor of Wadsley changed many times over the following centuries.

Eventually all indications of the former medieval way of life were slowly eradicated; the deer were removed from the park in 1621, Wadsley Hall was rebuilt in 1722 and the chapel was replaced by Wadsley Parish Church in 1834. In 1790 Joseph Clay bought the manor of Wadsley from Michael Burton, upon his death in 1797 he bequeathed it to his daughter, Ellen, the wife of George Bustard Greaves, of Page Hall. As Lord of the Manor, Greaves commissioned a survey of the manor in 1802, this was carried out by the Sheffield surveyors Fairbanks. The survey revealed 200 people as landowners within the manor and between them they possessed almost 2,400 acres. The largest landowner at the time was Samuel Turner who owned almost 650 acres, most individuals held smallholdings of between one and three acres.

From the 16th century up to the 1920s Wadsley's main industry was cutlery manufacturing; at the end of the 19th century there were over 100 cutler's shops in the village. The industry declined as the small workshops of Wadsley lost business to the large cutlery works of Sheffield. It is generally believed that the last little mester operating as a knife maker in Wadsley was Harry Horsfield who died in 1938. In 1901 Sheffield extended its boundaries and part of Wadsley came within the city; a further expansion in 1923 brought the rest of the village inside the city boundary. The recent history of Wadsley has been its development as a residential suburb with many houses built, especially in the area between Wadsley Lane and Langsett Avenue, in the 1930s. The original manor house that stood on Laird Road was controversially sold and demolished in 1958 to make way for the Laird Road Flats – after this happened the Wadsley conservation campaign ceased to be a coherent force. Over the next fifteen years most of the small old shops, houses and workshops of Wadsley were demolished virtually without opposition – culminating in the City Council's Wadsley redevelopment programme in 1968.

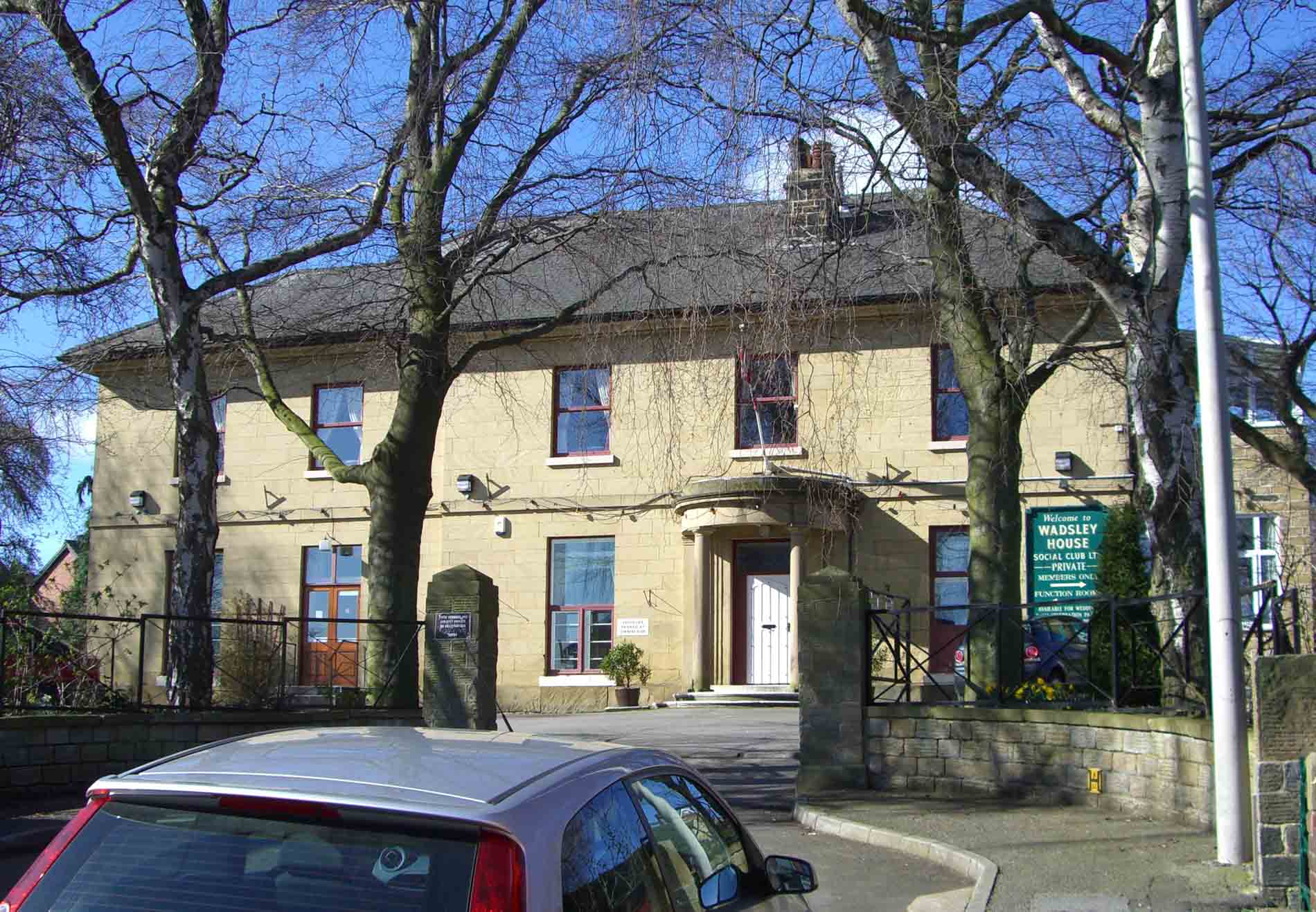
Wadsley House is now a social club.

== Historical buildings and eminent residents ==
Due to its former rural setting Wadsley has several country houses which are still standing within the now built-up suburb.

=== Wadsley House ===
Wadsley House (SK325906) is a grade two listed building which stands on a cul-de-sac called The Drive. George Calvert Holland M.D. lived in the house in the mid-19th century; his writings include "The Philosophy of Animated Nature" and "Vital Statistics of Sheffield". George Miller, a railway contractor who was involved in building the Manchester, Sheffield and Lincolnshire Railway bought the house in 1851 and lived there till his death in 1884. The house is now a social club with a bowling green attached, and is used as the local area's polling station during elections.

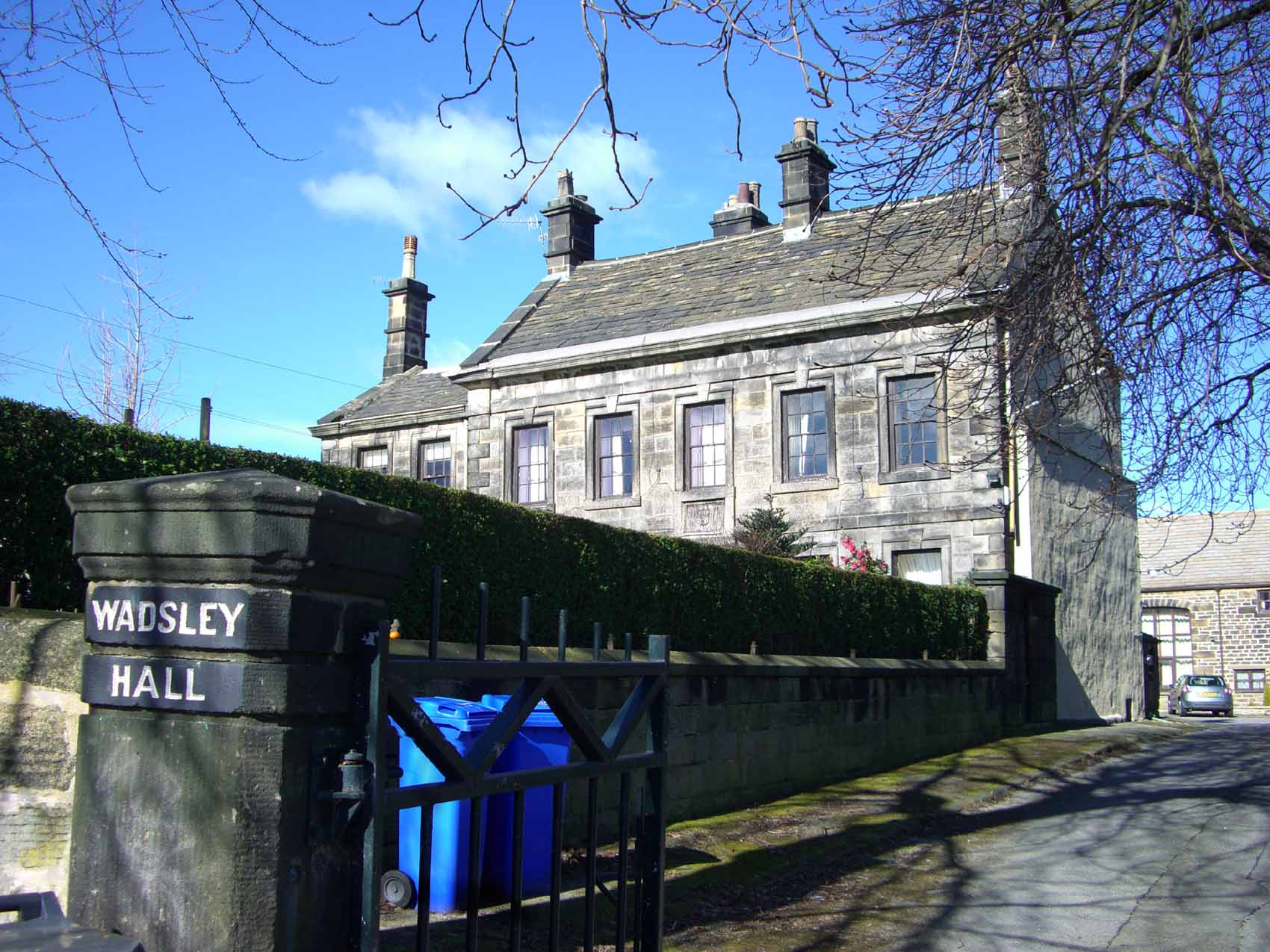
Wadsley Hall.

=== Wadsley Hall ===
Wadsley Hall and the adjacent outbuildings, (SK327904) which stand in Far Lane, are also grade two listed buildings and a structure of some antiquity. It was probably built in the 15th century although it was substantially modernised in 1722 by George Bamforth, the then lord of the manor. Sir Robert Wadsley, Lord of the Manor, built a chapel on to the east end of the hall in the 15th century; this was partly destroyed in the reign of Elizabeth I although not completely demolished until 1813. From 1812 it was the home of the Fowlers, one of Wadsley's most famous families. Sir John Fowler (1817–1898) was a famous railway engineer who co-constructed the Forth Bridge and completed many other railway projects around the world. William Fowler established the Sheepbridge coal and iron works near Chesterfield while Robert Fowler had a large solicitor's practice in Westminster. There is also some speculation that the artist Thomas Creswick (1811–1869) was born at Wadsley Hall, although two other Sheffield locations are claimed as his birthplace. After World War I the estate was broken up with much of the surrounding land sold off for new housing.

=== Loxley House ===
Despite its name, Loxley House (SK315903) is within the Wadsley area; it is also grade two listed and was originally built in 1795 by Thomas Halliday. The house was completely rebuilt it in 1826 by Thomas Payne.

=== Wadsley Grove ===
Wadsley Grove (SK317910) stands just off Worrall Road in a secluded situation being well screened by trees. It was the home of John Livesey who was vicar of St. Philip's Church, Shalesmoor in Sheffield between 1831 and 1870. In 1872 Wadsley Grove was purchased by John Marples, a wine merchant who acquired the "Wine and Spirit Commercial Hotel" on the corner of Fitzalan Square, Sheffield. Later known as the Marples Hotel, it was destroyed by bombing in December 1940 with much loss of life. Sheffield's first ever female Lord Mayor Ann Eliza Longden, who was elected in 1936, lived at Wadsley Grove.

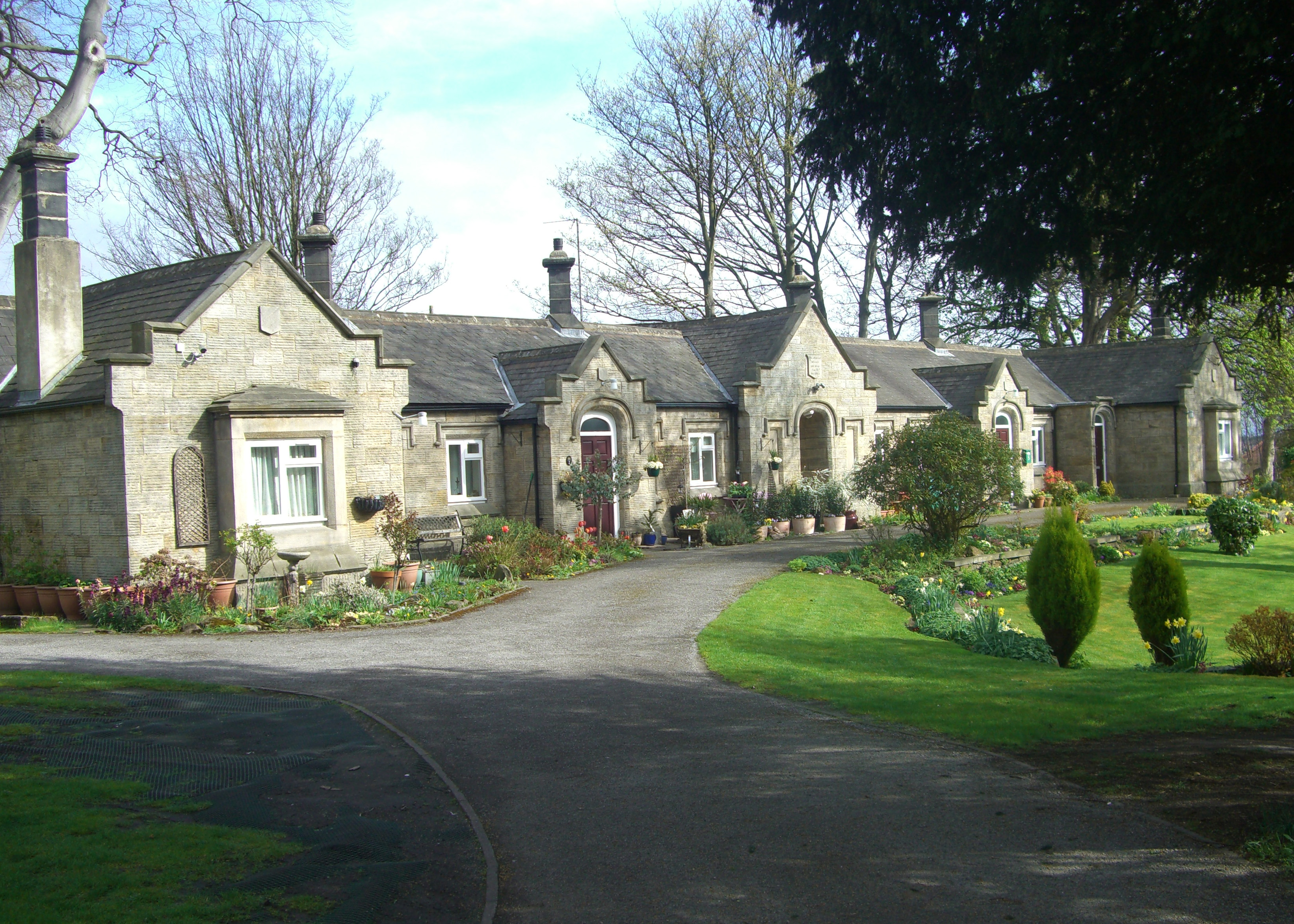
Wadsley Almshouses

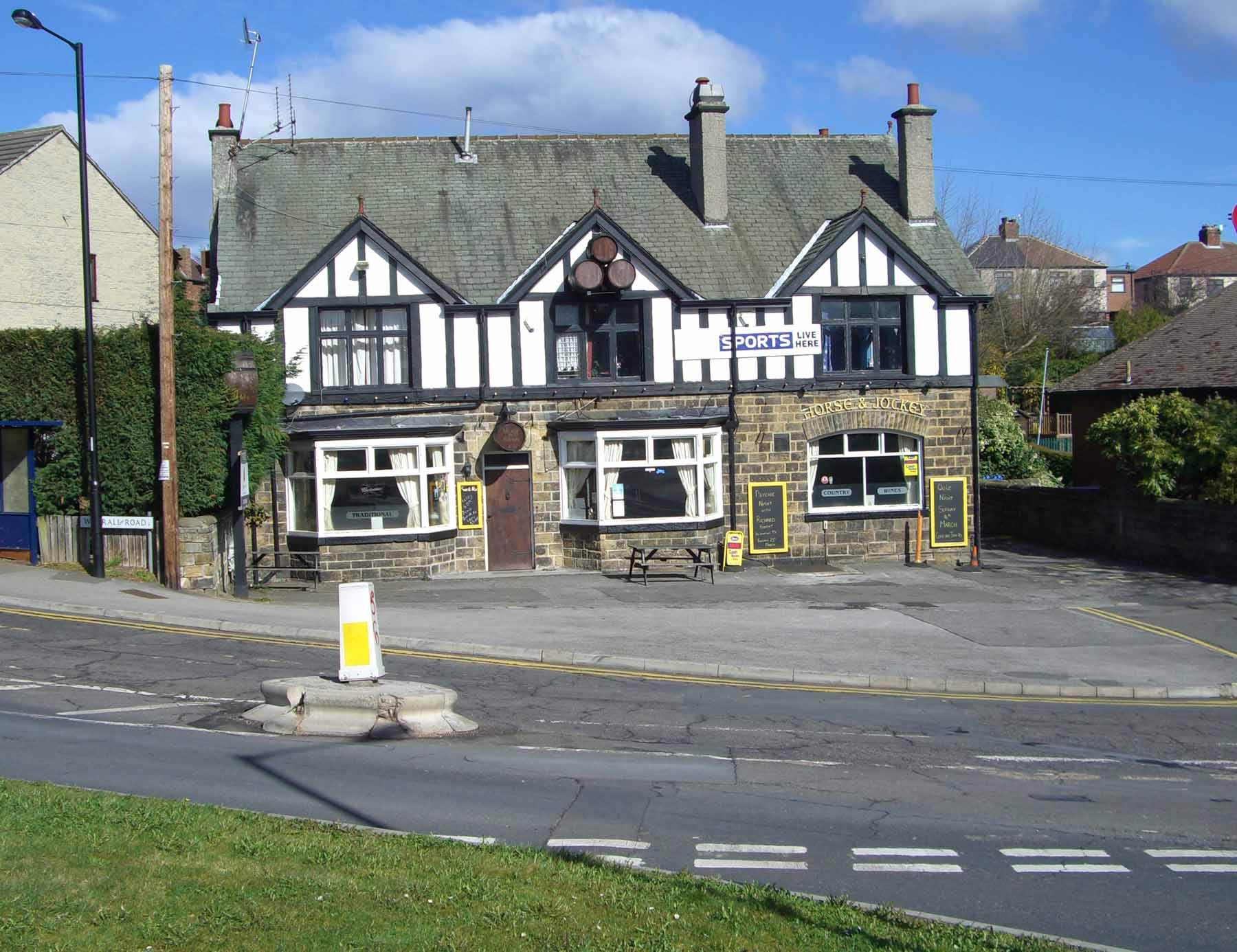
The Horse and Jockey pub stands at the junction of Wadsley Lane, Laird Road, Dykes Hall Road and Worrall Road. The centre of medieval Wadsley

=== Wadsley Almshouses ===
The Wadsley Almshouses are situated on Worrall Road next to the parish church and across the road from the Sportsman pub. They are a collection of six cottages built on land then known as "The Meadows" purchased in April 1839 by Miss Hannah Rawson of Wardsend House, Owlerton. They were constructed as a charitable project to be occupied by six poor widows of the Wadsley Church District. The total cost of the project came to £1,000 1s 5d. In June 1973 the almshouses were designated as a Grade II listed building.

=== Notable residents ===
The Victorian writer Reuben Hallam, also known as "Wadsley Jack", was from the area. He is best known for the 1866 book, Wadsley Jack; or, the Humours and Adventures of a Travelling Cutler. A pub, The Wadsley Jack, is named in his honour.

One of Wadsley's more famous modern residents was the politician Roy Hattersley who spent his youth living on Wadsley Lane and then Airedale Road; this early part of his life is covered in the book, "A Yorkshire Boyhood". His mother Enid was Lord Mayor of Sheffield in 1981. Professional cyclist and Commonwealth Games double gold medallist Malcolm Elliott was brought up in Prescott Road, Wadsley.

The tool collector and industrial historian Ken Hawley lived in Wadsley from the age of three until his death.

The English baritone, Peter Glossop was born in Wadsley.

== Amenities ==
Wadsley has two schools, Marlcliffe Community Primary School on Marlcliffe Road and Wisewood Community Primary School on Rural Lane they are both for pupils aged between 4 and 11. Wisewood School and Community Sports College was closed in the Summer of 2011 and demolished in March 2012. The school was merged with Myers Grove School which was also demolished to form the new Forge Valley School on Wood Lane at Malin Bridge. There are four public houses in the area, The Wadsley Jack (formerly called The Star) which has the original village stocks outside, The Rose and Crown (often referred to as The Top House) is 150 years old and was extended in the 1980s by knocking through into adjoining cottages. The Horse and Jockey stands where the original medieval village green was at the top of Wadsley Lane. The Sportsman is on Worrall Road near the church. The few shops in Wadsley are of the smaller variety scattered across the village, the nearest main shopping area is in nearby Hillsborough.

== Wadsley Common ==
Wadsley Common (SK312906) is a piece of land owned and held in trust by Sheffield City Council which is a public open space used as an area of recreation and exercise by the general public. Combined with the adjoining Loxley Common it covers 100 acres (0.40 km^{2}) and is an area of heather, oak, silver birch, bracken and grassland which was declared a local nature reserve in 1999. The Wadsley section of the common is designated as access land under the Countryside and Rights of Way Act 2000. Formerly there were four football pitches which belonged to Wadsley church on a section of the common but these are unused at present. To the north of the common is Hillsborough golf club laid out in 1920.

For a period of 130 years from 1784 the common was in private hands and was an area of mining and quarrying, with coal and ganister being mined and sandstone quarried for building. There were two drift mines on the common, the Bower mine and the Top mine. The Bower mine was owned by the Oughtibridge Silica Firebrick Company and operated between 1890 and 1940 while the Top mine probably ceased production in 1943.

In 1913 the common was given to the council by the descendants of the Payne family, who gave "seventy five acres of land at Loxley Common and Wadsley Common to be used by the public for the purpose of exercise and recreation, and to be known as Loxley Chase". The Common is managed by The Parks, Woodlands and Ranger Service who work for Sheffield City Council. The management plan was drawn up in consultation with local land owners, members of the public, representatives from the Wadsley and Loxley Commoners and local ecologists. The overall broad aim of the plan is: "To maintain and enhance the Commons as a wildlife, landscape, historical and recreational resource for the enjoyment of the local community and visitors alike."

== Politics ==
Wadsley belongs to the Hillsborough Ward which is represented on Sheffield City Council by three councillors.
