= Kate Bottley =

Church of England Vicar, journalist, media presenter

The Reverend Kate Bottley
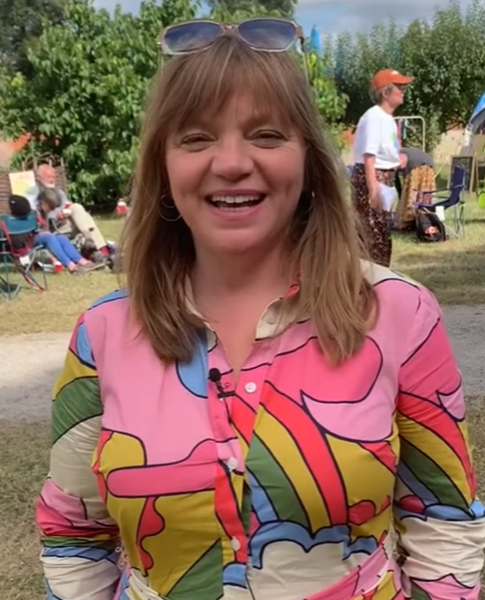
- Bottley in 2024
- Born: Kate Stevenson; 19 February 1975 (age 51); Sheffield, England
- Education: Myers Grove School; Tapton School; Leeds Trinity & All Saints
- Spouse: Graham Bottley (m. 1998)
- Children: 2

Ecclesiastical career
- Religion: Christianity
- Church: Church of England
- Ordained: 2008
- Bottley's voice Rev. Bottley speaking on her faith in 2024

Kate Bottley (née Stevenson) is an English journalist, presenter, and Church of England vicar.

== Early life and education ==
Kate Stevenson was born in 1975, at the Northern General Hospital, Sheffield, England and grew up in Freedom Road in the Walkley district of the city. She was educated at Walkley Primary School, Myers Grove School, where she was head girl and at Tapton School (sixth form), both state schools in Sheffield. She fell in love at a young age with the son of a local vicar and this led to her interest in the Church of England.

Bottley studied secondary religious education with Qualified Teacher Status (QTS) from 1993 to 1997 at Leeds Trinity & All Saints and then trained to be a religious education teacher in secondary schools. From 1997 to 2000 she worked as an RE teacher at Ecclesfield Secondary School. From 2000 to 2005 she was head of religious education at Yewlands Technology College in Grenoside in Sheffield.

She trained for ordination by being a vicar's personal assistant at St Mark's Church, Grenoside and then studying at St John's College, Nottingham.

== Ordained ministry ==
Bottley was ordained in the Church of England as a deacon in 2008 by George Cassidy and as a priest in 2009. She served her curacy at St Andrew's Church, Skegby in the Diocese of Southwell and Nottingham between 2008 and 2011. From 2011 to 2016, she was chaplain to North Nottinghamshire College, a further education college in Worksop, Nottinghamshire. She also ministered at St Mary and St Martin's Church, Blyth, where she was priest-in-charge from 2011 to 2013 and vicar from 2013 to 2016. From 2016, she was a non-stipendiary associate priest in the Retford Area Team Ministry (now dissolved). On 16 May 2021 she became an Honorary Canon of Southwell Minster. Honorary Canons are local clergy who have given distinguished service to the church, and who are invited to play a part in the life of the Minster as the Cathedral of the diocese.

== Media career ==
=== Reality television ===
Bottley has appeared on Channel 4's Gogglebox with her family, as well as Celebrity Mastermind and Celebrity MasterChef.

Channel 4 approached her to appear on Gogglebox following her involvement in a viral video recorded at a wedding in 2013, where she officiated and danced to Kool & the Gang's "Celebration". The video garnered more than 8 million views on YouTube. Bottley appeared on Gogglebox from 2014 to 2016, over five series.

=== Newspapers ===
Bottley has written for The Guardian, The Independent, The Times Educational Supplement and Radio Times, on topics of religious faith, television and education.

=== Radio ===
Bottley has been a guest contributor on BBC Radio 2's "Pause for Thought" on The Radio 2 Breakfast Show and presented the station's The Sunday Hour programme from 2017 to 2018. Since February 2018, with Jason Mohammad, she presents Good Morning Sunday. She has presented "Prayer for the Day" on BBC Radio 4.

=== Religious television ===
In 2016, she presented BBC One's main Easter programme. She presents the BBC One series "Sunday Morning Stories". Botley co-presented alongside Ashley John-Baptiste an 8-episode series for BBC Two Stories of Us, visiting people across the UK who lead spiritually and emotionally fulfilled lives. Bottley has appeared as a Canon on BBC One's Songs of Praise.

=== Gameshows ===
Bottley has appeared on Channel 4's 8 Out of 10 Cats quiz show as a panellist and on BBC1's Impossible celebrity version. In November 2019 she appeared on and won Richard Osman's House of Games and she also appeared as a celebrity expert on the 2020 Christmas special of Michael McIntyre's The Wheel. In February 2021, Bottley appeared on S14 E05 of Would I Lie To You?. She has appeared on Celebrity Mastermind and Blankety Blank.

=== Other appearances ===
In November 2021 Bottley was featured in the BBC series Winter Walks, walking in the Yorkshire Dales of Wensleydale and Coverdale, from Jervaulx Abbey to Middleham Castle.

== Personal life ==
She married Graham Bottley in May 1998 in Sheffield. Together they have two children: one son and one daughter. She lives in Retford, Nottinghamshire.

A former rugby player, Bottley is a regular open-water swimmer.
