= Reuben Hallam =

English carver, cutler, musician and author (1818-1908)

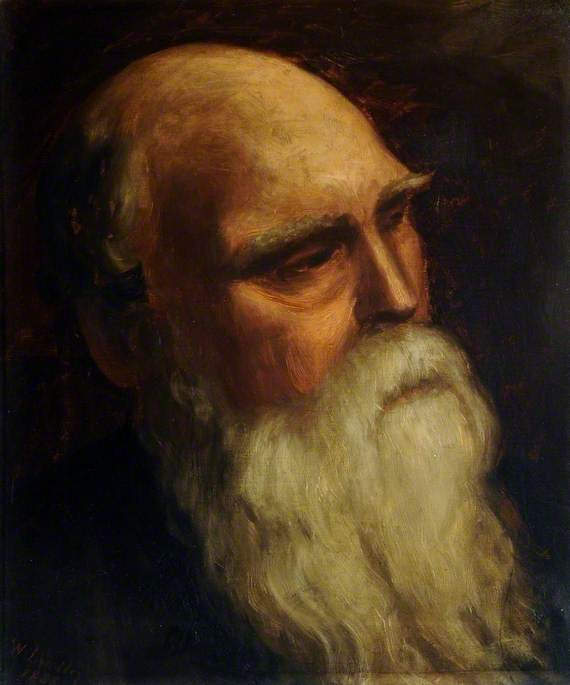
- Oil portrait by W. Lindley
- Born: 1818
- Died: 1908 (aged 89–90)
- Occupations: carver; Cutler; Orator; Singer; Author

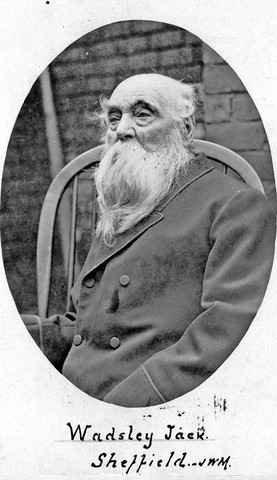
Reuben Hallam, aka Wadsley Jack, in later life

Reuben Hallam (1818 – 1908), also known as Wadsley Jack, was an English carver, cutler, musician and author, from the Wadsley district of Sheffield, England, who wrote in the Sheffield dialect. He is best known for the autobiographical work Wadsley Jack; or, the Humours and Adventures of a Travelling Cutler.

Wadsley Jack..., and its sequel Wadsley Jack's Married Life, were each serialised in the Sheffield Daily Telegraph in 1865 and 1866 respectively, prior to publication in book form.

In various decennial censuses, Hallam is listed as:

- 1851 a teacher of singing
- 1861 a spring knife cutler
- 1871 a spring knife cutler
- 1881 an artist (as are three of his children)
- 1891 a weighman
- 1901 a spring knife cutler

He also worked as an organist, orator and singer.

His portrait, in oil on canvas, by W. Lindley, is in the collection of Museums Sheffield. Another portrait of Hallam, by Willis Eadon, was exhibited at the August 1888 Sheffield Society of Artists' exhibition. The Sheffield Daily Telegraph's unnamed reviewer wrote that "it shows evidence of rather clever treatment in bringing out a strong individuality". Reviewing the same exhibition, The Sheffield and Rotherham Independent referred to Hallam as "a local celebrity".

A pub in Wadsley, The Wadsley Jack, formerly The Star, was renamed in his honour.

== Works ==
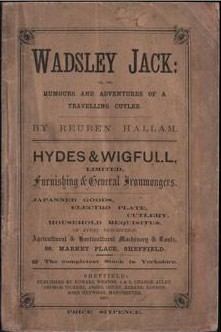
Front Cover of an 1881, paperback, edition of Wadsley Jack

- An Introduction to the Art of Singing. 1849.
- Wadsley Jack; or, the Humours and Adventures of a Travelling Cutler. London: John Holmes, Oxford Street. 1866.
