= Tapton School =

Location
- Darwin Lane; Sheffield, South Yorkshire, S10 5RG; England; 53.3766°N 1.5174°W

Information
- Type: Academy
- Motto: Valuing everyone, Caring for each other, Achieving excellence
- Established: 1959 – Crosspool, Sheffield
- Local authority: City of Sheffield
- Specialist: Formerly Science College & Arts Alliance
- Department for Education URN: 138069 Tables
- Ofsted: Reports
- Head Teacher: Anna Siddell
- Staff: over 100
- Age: 11 to 18
- Enrolment: approx. 1,650
- Website: http://www.taptonschool.co.uk

Tapton School is a secondary school with academy status located in Crosspool, in Sheffield, South Yorkshire, England. It is sited next to another secondary, King Edward VII School in Sheffield, and near to Lydgate Junior School in Crosspool, Lydgate Infant School in Sheffield and Notre Dame Catholic High School in Sheffield. Tapton School has approximately 1,650 pupils, aged between 11 and 18 years old. Tapton officially opened in 1960, but in 2000 the school was rebuilt under the Private Finance Initiative. Students and faculties officially moved to the new building in September 2001.

== History ==
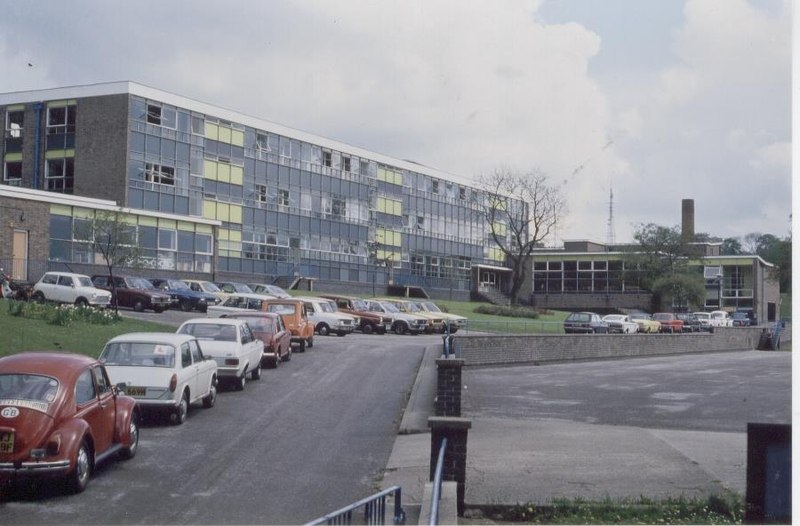
Tapton School (1979)

Tapton Secondary School opened in 1960 with 660 pupils. The pupils came from three local schools who lost their senior school to provide the pupils. These three schools, Springfield County, Nethergreen, and Crookes Endowed, became Junior schools.

The original 1950s school was knocked down and replaced by new premises under the private Finance Initiative in 2001 and is rented from its landlords, Interserve PLC.

After April 2011 the school was affected by changes in the funding of 6th formers and the discontinuation of the specialist schools programme. As a result of this funding change, Tapton governors sought academy status, which was approved, the changeover date being August 2011.

== School site ==
New buildings include 15 science laboratories, a technology block with 10 classrooms, a music block with dedicated practice rooms, a drama studio, and a gym and sports hall. Outside, there is also a floodlit astroturf and tennis court, used by local organisations and other schools for a range of sports. In October 2015, a new building opened, with 4 geography classrooms and a dance studio which is often used as an assembly hall.

== Recognition ==
The school was inspected by Ofsted on 26 November 2024 and received ratings as follows:

Key Judgement	Outcome
Quality of education	Outstanding
Behaviour and attitudes	Outstanding
Personal development	Outstanding
Leadership and management	Outstanding
Sixth form provision	Outstanding

School students have attained places on the Prime Minister's Global Fellowship programme. The school achieved its first student in the inaugural year of the programme, 2008, and in 2009 had another successful applicant.

== Tapton Youth Brass Band ==
Tapton Youth Brass Band' is a brass band formed in 1994 as the Tapton School band.

== Notable former pupils ==
- Kate Bottley, Anglican priest, TV personality, and journalist
- Sebastian Coe, British politician, former athlete, former head of the British Olympic Association
- Rachel Cooke, journalist
- Oluwateniola (Chris) Amusan, Footballer
- Matt Fitzpatrick, golfer, winner of the 2022 U.S. Open
- Philip Hensher, novelist and critic
- Adam Johnson, cricketer
- Becky Lyne, athlete
- Richard McCourt, better known as Dick from Dick and Dom
- David James Richards, Silicon Valley entrepreneur and technology executive
- Rick Savage, Pete Willis and Tony Kenning, three of the founding members of Def Leppard
- Charlie Webster, sports TV presenter
- James Woods, freeskier

== Notable former staff ==
- Miriam Cates, Member of Parliament, formerly taught Chemistry and Biology at Tapton.
