= Forge Valley School =

Location
- Wood Lane; Sheffield, South Yorkshire, S6 5HG; England
- Coordinates: 53.3981°N 1.5194°W

Information
- Type: Academy
- Motto: Ambition, Endeavour, Success
- Established: 2011
- Local authority: City of Sheffield
- Department for Education URN: 140547 Tables
- Executive headteacher: David Bowes
- Head teacher: Dale Barrowclough
- Age: 11 to 18
- Public transport: B Malin Bridge
- Website: http://www.forgevalley.school/

Forge Valley School is a secondary school and sixth form located in Sheffield, South Yorkshire England. It replaced Myers Grove School and Wisewood School & Community Sports College. The school has its own sports centre which is used by the school and community. The school converted to Academy status in September 2014, sponsored by the Tapton School Academy Trust.

== Ofsted ==
In May 2013 it was reported by local newspaper Sheffield Star that the school had been placed under special measures by Ofsted after being deemed 'inadequate'. The report, which was based on an inspection in March 2013, rated the school Grade 4 overall and in all areas, the lowest possible value in a scale from 1 to 4. Head teacher Diane McKinlay responded to the report by stating that Forge Valley was a new school "which is still developing and improving" results.

In late November 2013 Forge Valley received a short inspection from Ofsted.

== Events ==
Forge Valley has presented five productions:

- 2011-2012 – Oliver!
- 2012-2013 – We Will Rock You
- 2015-2016 – Aladdin, Blues Brothers, Bugsy Malone, Lion King and Wizard of Oz
- 2016-2017 – Matilda, Beauty and the Beast and Into the Woods
- 2017-2018 – Mary Poppins, Les Miserables, Little Shop of Horrors and Shrek The Musical

In September 2016, a 41-year-old teacher at the school, Lynsey Haycock, died from medical complications after breaking her leg in a fall while putting up a classroom display.
