= Myers Grove School =

Location
- Wood Lane; Sheffield, South Yorkshire, S6 5HG; England; 53.3981°N 1.5194°W

Information
- Type: State, secondary school
- Established: c. 1960
- Closed: 2011
- Local authority: City of Sheffield
- Age: 11 to 16
- Enrolment: 1050

Myers Grove School was a secondary school (11–18) in the north-west of Sheffield, South Yorkshire, England. The school was bidding to become a businesses and enterprise college. It has now merged with Wisewood School & Community Sports College to become Forge Valley Community School, opened in September 2011.

Myers Grove opened in about 1960 as the first purpose-built comprehensive school in Sheffield. It originally had a 6th form, lost in a reorganisation in 1988, when the Lower School buildings became the Wood Lane buildings of Loxley College, part of Sheffield College.

== Headteachers ==
- 1960 - 1978 William Hill
- 1978 - 1993 Roy Yates
- 1993 - 1998 David Lowe
- 1998 - 2003 Gerry Richardson
- 2003 - 2004 John Hull
- 2004 - 2008 John Wilkinson
- 2008 - 2011 Andrew Ireland (acting head) / Diane McKinley (executive head)

Andrew Ireland was appointed acting head, with Diane McKinley in overall charge during the ongoing merger with Wisewood School as executive head. The proposed merger was opposed by a group of parents despite the opposition being rejected by the High Court in early 2007.

== Notable former pupils ==
- Kate Bottley - Anglican priest, TV personality, and journalist
- Paul Carrack - musician, formerly of Squeeze
- Chris Turner - former Sheffield Wednesday goalkeeper and manager
