= Timeline of Sheffield history =

This timeline of Sheffield history summarises key events in the history of Sheffield, a city in England. The origins of the city can be traced back to the founding of a settlement in a clearing beside the River Sheaf in the second half of the 1st millennium AD. The area had seen human occupation since at least the last ice age, but significant growth in the settlements that are now incorporated into the city did not occur until the Industrial Revolution.

== Early history ==
- Mesolithic: Maglemosians are known to have occupied the Deepcar area of Sheffield.
- Late Neolithic or Bronze Age period: Evidence of occupation can be found in Ecclesall Woods where early inhabitants carved a 'cup and ring' stone.
- Iron Age: Brigantes constructed forts at Wincobank and Carl Wark, and the Roman Rig dyke.
- c. 70 : A Roman fort was constructed at Templeborough.
- 1st or 2nd century: Romans built a rural estate centre, or ‘villa’ on what is believed to be a pre-existing Brigantian farmstead at Whirlow Hall Farm. Roman auxiliaries of the Sunuci tribe were granted land in the Stannington area of Sheffield in AD 124. Other evidence of Roman occupation near to Stannington comes from finds on Walkley Bank Road.
- 9th century: The Sheffield area was part of the Danelaw. Evidence of Viking occupation comes from the roots of place names in and around Sheffield such as Lescar, Carbrook, Carsick Hill, Hooks Carr Sick, the Hurkling stone, Grimesthorpe, Upperthorpe, Netherthorpe and many more.
- Early 9th century: The Sheffield Cross, an Anglo-Saxon cross was carved. It is thought that this was erected on the (future) site of Sheffield Cathedral.
- 829: According to the Anglo-Saxon Chronicle, King Egbert of Wessex received the submission of King Eanred of Northumbria at the hamlet of Dore (now a suburb of Sheffield).
- 942: Edmund I of England re-conquered the Midlands, and advanced as far as Dore.

== 1000–1099 ==
- 1069/70: Any settlements in the Sheffield area were likely destroyed in the harrying of the North.
- 1076: Waltheof, 1st Earl of Northampton and Lord of the manor of Hallam, was executed.

== 1100–1199 ==
- c. 1102: Hallamshire passes to Roger de Lovetot, along with the Honour of Tickhill.
- c. 1130: William de Lovetot founded a church on the (future) site of Sheffield Cathedral. Around this time, Sheffield becomes a parish, having previously been part of the parish of Ecclesfield.
- c. 1150: William de Lovetot built a castle in Sheffield. He also had the first Lady's Bridge built, established a corn mill and hospital in the town, and founded St Mary's church at nearby Handsworth (now a suburb of the city).
- 1176 (or 1183): Beauchief Abbey was established, 4 miles southwest of the town of Sheffield, in Beauchief.

== 1200–1299 ==
- c. 1250: Church House at Handsworth (now the Cross Keys public house) was built.
- 1266: A party of barons, led by John de Eyvill, marching from north Lincolnshire to Derbyshire passed through Sheffield and destroyed the town, burning the church and castle.
- 1270: Thomas de Furnival, son of Gerard de Furnival, is given licence to crenellate and subsequently builds a large stone castle to replace the wooden castle destroyed in 1266.
- 1279–81: In the Quo Warranto enquiries, Thomas de Furnival claims the right to hold a market in Sheffield, to hunt, and to enforce the death penalty.
- c. 1280: A new church was consecrated by William II Wickwane the Archbishop of York.
- 1293–94: In further Quo Warranto enquiries, Thomas de Furnival claims the right to hold a Sunday market and a fair on the eve and day of Holy Trinity.
- 1296: On 12 November, Sheffield is granted a royal charter to hold a weekly market and a three-day annual fair around Holy Trinity. The first reference to Sheffield's Town Mill appears.
- 1297:
  - "Robert the Cutler" is recorded in a tax return, the earliest surviving reference to the manufacture of cutlery in Sheffield.
  - Thomas de Furnival grants a charter to the people of Sheffield establishing the Burgery of Sheffield.

== 1300–1399 ==
- 1387: Geoffrey Chaucer in The Reeve's Tale from his book The Canterbury Tales gave an early reference to Sheffield and the metal industry for which the town would become famous.

== 1400–1499 ==
- 1430: The 1280 parish church was pulled down and replaced with a new building, the core of the present cathedral.
- 1434: "Barker of Balme" is mentioned in a deed dated this year. He is thought to have constructed "Barker's Pool", Sheffield's first reservoir. Once a month the reservoir gates were opened allowing water to wash the filth from the town's streets (with open sewers along their centres) into the River Don.
- c. 1475: "The hawle at the Poandes" (now the Old Queen's Head public house) was built.
- 1485: Lady's Bridge was replaced with a new stone-built bridge, still in existence.

== 1500–1599 ==
- c. 1500: Bishops' House built.
- c. 1510: George Talbot, 4th Earl of Shrewsbury, built the Manor Lodge outside the town.
- 1520: The Shrewsbury Chapel was added to Sheffield Parish Church.
- 1530: Cardinal Wolsey, following his arrest, was detained at the Manor Lodge for eighteen days.
- 1537: Beauchief Abbey was dissolved, the estate becoming the property of Sir Nicholas Strelley.
- 1554: A charter establishes the Twelve Capital Burgesses and Commonality of the Town and Parish of Sheffield.
- 1570: Mary, Queen of Scots, began her 14-year imprisonment at Sheffield Castle and the Manor Lodge, under the guard of George Talbot, 6th Earl of Shrewsbury
- 1584: Shepherd Wheel passed to the sons of William Beighton in his will.

== 1600–1699 ==
- 1604: Sheffield Grammar School began.
- 1621: Carbrook Hall was built.
- 1624: The Company of Cutlers in Hallamshire was formed to oversee the cutlery trade in the town.
- 1630: Attercliffe Chapel was built.
- 1638: The Company of Cutlers in Hallamshire erect the first Cutlers' Hall.
- 1642–1651: The English Civil Wars:
- 1642: The people of Sheffield led by Sir John Gell seized Sheffield Castle for the Parliamentarians.
- 1643: The castle was taken by Royalist forces.
- 1648: After a long siege the castle was once again taken by Parliamentarian forces, and an Act of Parliament passed for its demolition (slighting).

== 1700–1799 ==
- 1700: Upper Chapel, the first non-conformist chapel in the city, was built.
- 1721: St Paul's Church was built as a chapel-of-ease to the parish church, but due to a dispute it did not open until 1740.
- 1736: The first buildings in Paradise Square are constructed.
- 1740s: Benjamin Huntsman, a clock maker in Handsworth invented a form of the crucible steel process for making a better quality of steel than had previously been available.
- 1743: Thomas Boulsover, working in Sheffield, invented "Sheffield plate".
- 1751: River Don Navigation extended to Tinsley.
- 1756: An Act of Parliament undertakes to turnpike the road south from Sheffield, to Chesterfield and London.
- c. 1769: Britannia metal was invented in Sheffield, originally being known as "Vickers white metal".
- 1771:
  - Paradise Square is completed.
  - Sheffield Book Society founded.
- 1773: Sheffield was given a silver assay office.
- c. 1775: The Duke of Norfolk commissioned plans for a new quarter, to be constructed on Alsop Fields.
- 1779: John Wesley preached in Paradise Square on 15 July.
- 1789
  - 769 Sheffield metalworkers submit a petition to Parliament advocating the abolition of slavery.
  - Industrial conglomerate Newton, Chambers & Co. established in Sheffield.
- 1792: The body of Spence Broughton, convicted for robbing the Sheffield and Rotherham mail, was hung in a gibbet on Attercliffe Common. It remained there for the next 36 years.
- 1793: A petition against slavery with 8,000 names is submitted from Sheffield to Parliament.
- 1797: Sheffield Royal Infirmary opened.

== 1800–1899 ==
- 1805: A new nave was added to the parish church.
- 1808: The small town hall that had stood near the parish church was replaced with a new building at the corner of Waingate and Castle Street.
- 1818: The Sheffield Improvement Act 1818 established an Improvement Commission to maintain cleaning, lighting and watching within three-quarters of a mile of the parish church, and also the Sheffield Gas Light Company.
- 1819: Sheffield Canal opened.
- 1828: Sheffield Medical School established.
- 1832:
  - A cholera epidemic claimed 402 lives in the town, later commemorated by the Cholera Monument.
  - Sheffield gained representation in the House of Commons as a Parliamentary Borough. The first election is marred by rioting.
- 1836: Sheffield Botanical Gardens and Sheffield General Cemetery opened.
- 1838:
  - A new Cutlers' Hall was built, forming the core of the current building.
  - The first railway station in Sheffield, Sheffield Wicker station, opened on 31 October as the southern terminus of the Sheffield and Rotherham Railway.
- 1843:
  - Sheffield was incorporated as a municipal borough.
  - Sheffield School of Design foundedl renamed Sheffield School of Art in 1850.
- 1845: Bridgehouses railway station, the terminal station of the Sheffield, Ashton-under-Lyne and Manchester Railway opened
- 1846: Sheffield, Rotherham, Barnsley, Wakefield, Huddersfield and Goole Railway formed (closed in 1858)
- 1847: Manchester, Sheffield and Lincolnshire Railway formed.
- 1848:
  - The Roman Catholic Church of St Marie (later a cathedral) was completed.
  - The Wicker Arches were constructed.
  - The parish of Sheffield was subdivided into smaller parishes.
- 1851:
  - Sheffield Victoria Station opened on 15 September.
  - Sheffield Female Political Association founded.
- 1853: Sheffield Public Library established.
- 1855: Bramall Lane opened as a cricket ground.
- 1857: Sheffield F.C., the oldest football club in the world among those that have played, or do play, Association football (soccer), was founded.
- 1858: Sheffield Trades and Labour Council founded as the "Sheffield Association of Organised Trades".
- 1860: Hallam F.C. was founded.
- 1862: A 3,000-strong riot occurred at Wardsend Cemetery in the Hillsborough district of the city, against accusations of body-snatchers operating.
- 1864:
  - The Great Sheffield flood devastated large parts of the town, killing 270 people.
  - By-laws were passed prohibiting the construction of back-to-back houses in the town.
- 1866: The United Kingdom Alliance of Organised Trades, a forerunner of the Trades Union Congress (TUC), was founded in Sheffield .
- 1867:
  - The Sheffield Football Association founded
  - Sheffield Wednesday F.C. was founded.
- 1870: Midland Main Line extension from Chesterfield to Sheffield opened, with the new terminus at Sheffield Midland station.
- 1871: New head post office opened at 2 Haymarket.
- 1873: The first horse-drawn trams ran in Sheffield.
- 1875: Weston Park & Firth Park opened.
- 1878: The first ever floodlit football match was played at Bramall Lane on 14 October.
- 1879: Portland Works opened.
- 1885:
  - The Mappin Art Gallery opened.
  - Henderson's Relish first produced.
- 1888: Became a county borough.
- 1889: Sheffield United F.C. was founded.
- 1893: A Royal Charter granted the municipal borough of Sheffield the style and title of "city".
- 1897:
  - The University of Sheffield was established.
  - A new town hall was opened on Pinstone Street, the old building subsequently being used as the county court.
  - The Lyceum Theatre opened.
- 1899:
  - Hillsborough Stadium opened.
  - The first electric tram ran on the Sheffield Tramway.

== 1900–1999 ==
- 1901: Population:409,070.
- 1913: Stainless steel was invented by Harry Brearley whilst working at the Brown Firth Laboratories in Sheffield.
- 1914: Sheffield became a diocese of the Church of England, and the parish church became a cathedral.
- 1919: Sheffield City Council began building council houses, mostly to the north and east of the city centre.
- 1925: Sheffield War Memorial unveiled.
- 1926: The Labour Party first took control of the city council.
- 1928: Sheffield Repertory Theatre opens.
- 1934:
  - Sheffield City Hall completed.
  - Sheffield Central Library & Graves Art Gallery opened by Queen Elizabeth The Queen Mother.
- 1934/1935: Districts formerly in Derbyshire including Beauchief, Dore, Totley, Norton, and Woodseats were annexed by Sheffield.
- 1938: St Paul's Church was demolished to make way for an extension to the Town Hall. The extension was never built, and the site subsequently became the Peace Gardens.
- 1940: The "Sheffield Blitz"—heavy bombing over the nights of 12 and 15 December led to the loss of over 660 lives, and the destruction of numerous buildings.
- 1955–1962: The Gleadless Valley estate was built.
- 1957–1961: Park Hill flats were built.
- 1962: The city is devastated by the Great Sheffield Gale, killing four people and damaging more than 150,000 houses.
- 1965: The University of Sheffield Arts Tower was completed.
- 1971: The Crucible Theatre opened.
- 1974:
  - The Local Government Act 1972 led to the formation of the Metropolitan borough of Sheffield.
  - Sheffield Parkway was opened.
- 1977:
  - The "eggbox" extension to the Town Hall was built.
  - The World Snooker Championship is hosted by the city's Crucible Theatre for the first time.
- 1979:
  - The Royal Hallamshire Hospital opened.
  - The Crucible Theatre hosts the World Snooker Championship for the first time.
- 1980: The Roman Catholic Diocese of Hallam was created with the Church of St Marie as its cathedral.
- 1981: The film Looks and Smiles, which depicts the economic depression of the city, wins Best Contemporary Screenplay prize at the Cannes Film Festival.
- 1984:
  - The television film Threads, which simulates the effect of a nuclear attack on Sheffield, becomes the subject of debate in the British media.
  - The Battle of Orgreave takes place at the Orgreave Coke Works
- 1988: The Sheffield Development Corporation was established.
- 1989: The Hillsborough disaster—96 Liverpool F.C. fans were crushed to death at Hillsborough Stadium.
- 1990:
  - The Meadowhall shopping centre opened.
  - The Don Valley Stadium opened.
  - Meadowhall Interchange opened.
- 1991:
  - Sheffield Arena and Ponds Forge opened.
  - Sheffield hosted the World Student Games.
- 1994: The first section of the Sheffield Supertram network was opened.
- 1995: Brightside railway station is closed.
- 1997:
  - The Gatecrasher nightclub moved to Sheffield.
  - The film The Full Monty (set in Sheffield) was released.
- 1997: Sheffield City Airport opened.

== 2000–present ==
- 2001: The Millennium Galleries opened.
- 2003:
  - The Winter Gardens opened on the former site of the 1977 Town Hall "Egg Box" extension.
  - English Institute of Sport, Sheffield, opens.
- 2007:
  - The Gatecrasher nightclub burnt down.
  - Flooding in June caused millions of pounds worth of damage to buildings in the city and led to the loss of two lives.
- 2008:
  - Sheffield City Airport closed.
  - The two remaining cooling towers by the Tinsley Viaduct were demolished.
- 2013: The Don Valley Stadium closed due financial problems.
- 2018: Sheffield Supertram is extended to Parkgate via Tinsley using tram-train motive power.

== See also ==
- Timelines of other cities in Yorkshire and the Humber: Bradford, Hull, York

== Bibliography ==
- Addy, Sidney Oldall (1888). A Glossary of Words Used in the Neighbourhood of Sheffield. Including a Selection of Local Names, and Some Notices of Folk-Lore, Games, and Customs. London: Trubner & Co. for the English Dialect Society. (wikisource)
- Batty, Stephen R. (2005). Rail Centres: Sheffield. Nottingham: Booklaw Publications. ISBN 1-901945-21-9.
- Chisholm, Hugh, ed. (1910). "Sheffield" . Encyclopædia Britannica. Vol. 24 (11th ed.). Cambridge University Press. p. 823.
- Harman, R.; Minnis, J. (2004). Pevsner City Guides: Sheffield. New Haven & London: Yale University Press. ISBN 0-300-10585-1.
- Hey, David (2003). Medieval South Yorkshire. Landmark Publishing Limited. ISBN 1-84306-080-9.
- Hunter, Joseph (1819). Hallamshire. The History and Topography of the Parish of Sheffield in the County of York. London: Lackington, Hughes, Harding, Mayor & Jones. (wikisource)
- Taylor, John, ed. (1879). The Illustrated Guide to Sheffield and the Surrounding District. Sheffield: Pawson and Brailsford.
- Vickers, J. Edward MBE (1999). Old Sheffield Town. An Historical Miscellany (2nd ed.). Sheffield: The Hallamshire Press Limited. ISBN 1-874718-44-X.
