= Ann Jessop =

(bap. 1782, d. 1864), UK cabinet-maker

- Born: 1780; Sheffield
- Died: 23 September 1864 (aged 83–84); Sheffield
- Occupation: business person

Ann Jessop or Ann Wilde; Ann Turner or Ann Bardwell (c.1781 – 23 September 1864) was a British cabinet-maker based in Sheffield.

== Life ==
Jessop was born in Sheffield and baptised in 1782 in what is now Sheffield Cathedral. Her parents were Adam and Elizabeth Wilde. She appears to have had little formal education as she could not sign her own name when she married Charles Turner in Sheffield and later Edward Bardwell in Rotherham. Bardwell was a cabinet maker and when he died in 1821 she took over the business.

She started to make, and write, her name when she married her third husband. When he died she moved to the business to smaller premises but she was the registered owner of their cabinet-making business in 1833. It remained in her name until she married her fourth husband.

In 1841 she was again the registered owner of the business. It is clear that the business was well regarded as they were asked to bid to supply hundreds of mahogany chairs and matching tables.

In 1852 her business was still operating in Fargate in Sheffield.

Jessop died in her own home in 1864 in Sheffield.
