= Christopher Webb =

English stained glass designer

The East Window of St. Alban's Church, Southampton

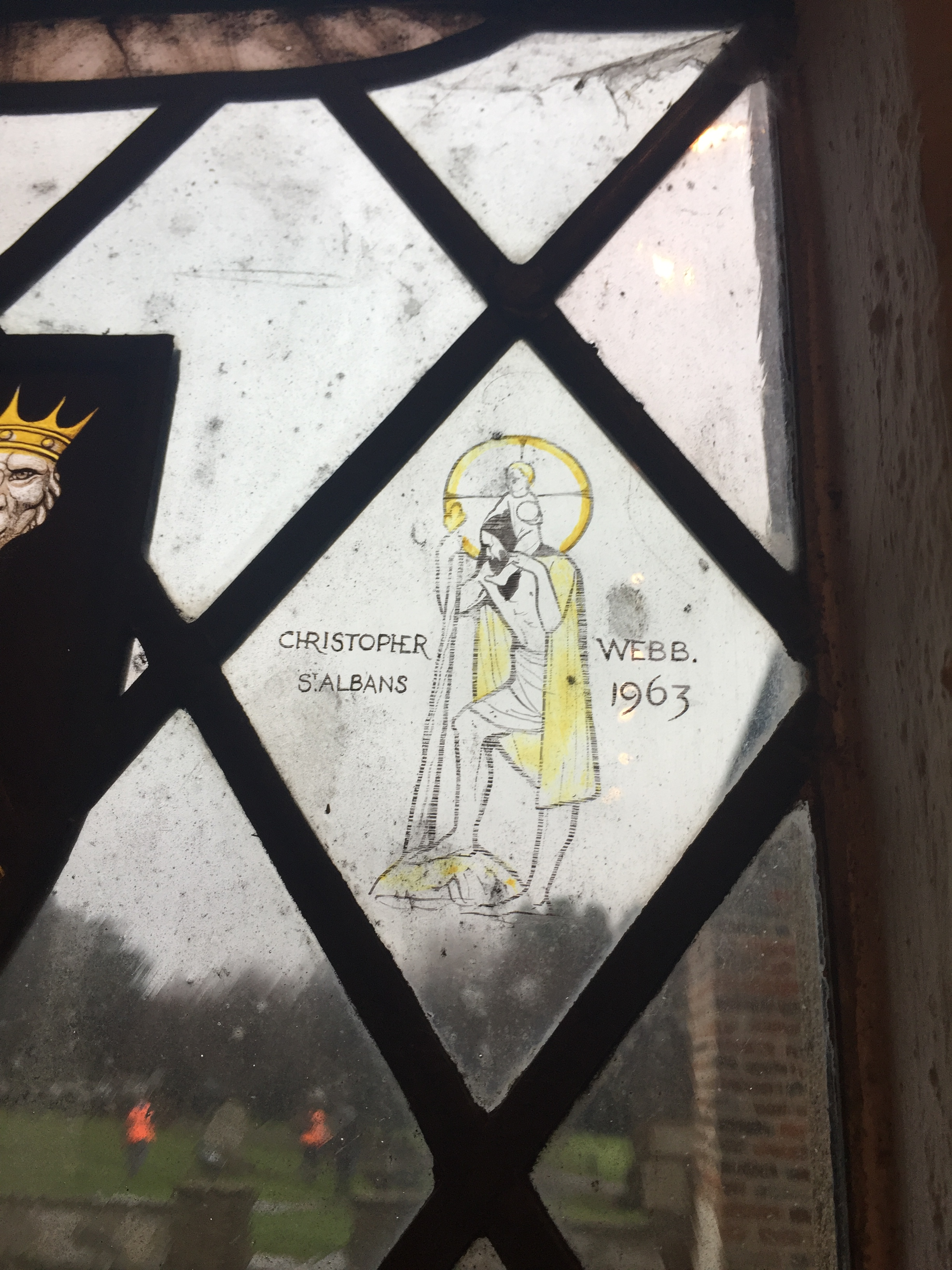
His maker's mark (in St Mary's Church, Redbourn)

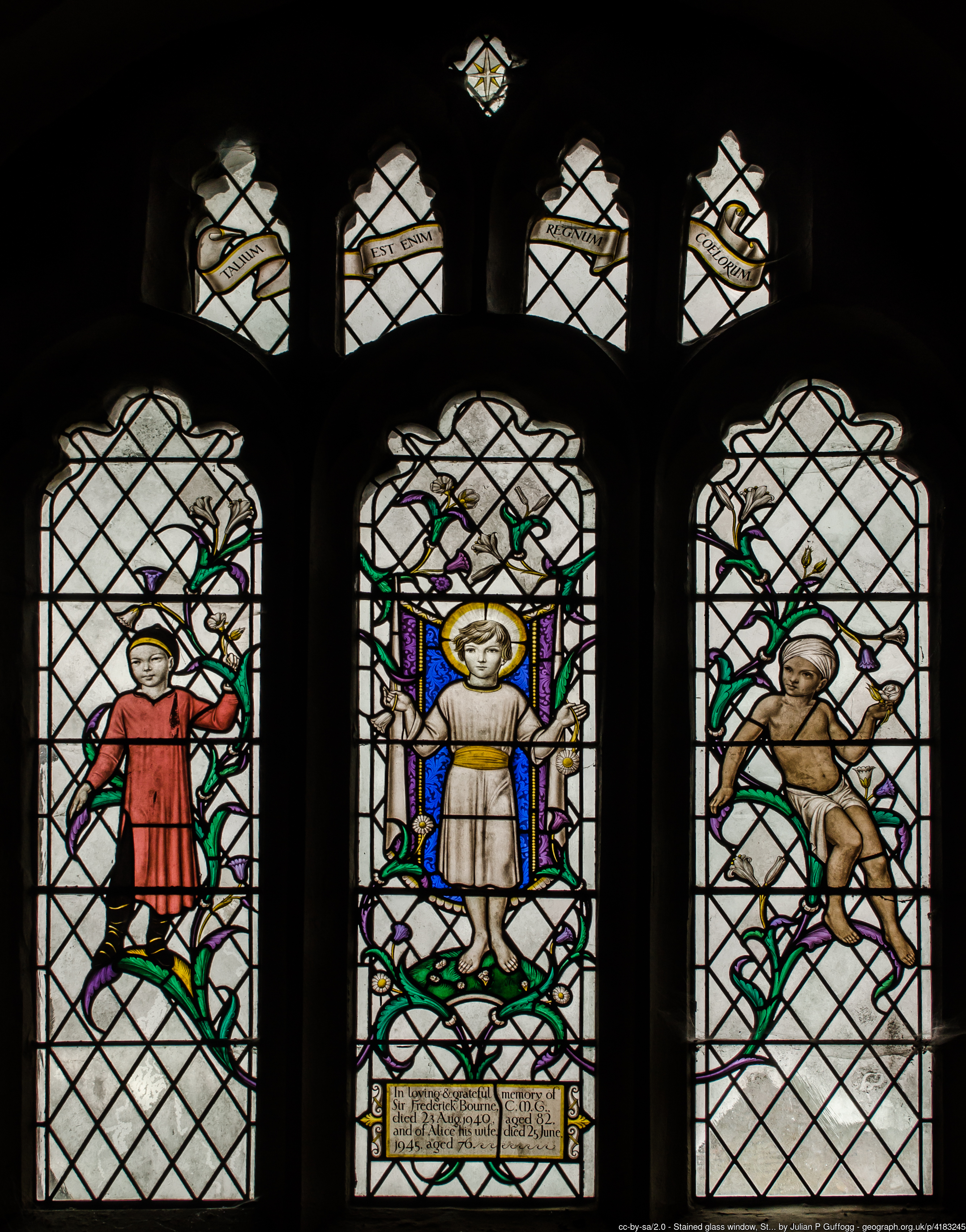
Stained glass window, St Dunstan's church, Mayfield in memory of Sir Frederick Bourne

Christopher Rahere Webb (1886–1966) was an English stained glass designer.

His unusual second name was derived from that of the founder of St Bartholomew's Priory in London where his father, Edward Alfred Webb and his uncle, Sir Aston Webb carried out restoration work. Webb was educated at Rugby School and at the Slade School of Art and then articled to Sir Ninian Comper.

His glass work is among the finest of the first half of the 20th century. Sixteen examples of his mature work dating from 1935 to 1948 are at Sheffield Cathedral; among these are the unique series on the history of Sheffield in the Chapter House.

Webb's signature is a Saint Christopher with his initials, usually placed in the bottom right hand corner of the window. Characteristics of his style are accuracy of historical detail, his ability to convey basic theological ideas with clarity, the prominence of clear glass and his use of scrolls and foliage.

Webb's last window design was installed in 1967, the year after he died, in the narthex of the Church of All Saints, Clifton.

== Sources ==
- Cottam, Alan (2004) The Stained Glass of Sheffield Cathedral
- Cottam, Alan (1993) Sheffield Cathedral Stained Glass
- Jarvis, Alfred Charles Eustace (1939) A Guide to the Additions to the Fabric of the Cathedral Church of Saint Peter and Paul, Sheffield, consecrated and dedicated on Tuesday 14 February 1939; compiled by Provost Jarvis. Sheffield: Northend [printer]
- Lunn, David, Bishop of Sheffield (1987) Chapters Towards a History of the Cathedral and Parish Church of St. Peter and St. Paul, Sheffield
