= Castle Market =

Indoor market in Sheffield, England

Coordinates: 53°23′4.9″N 1°27′47.6″W

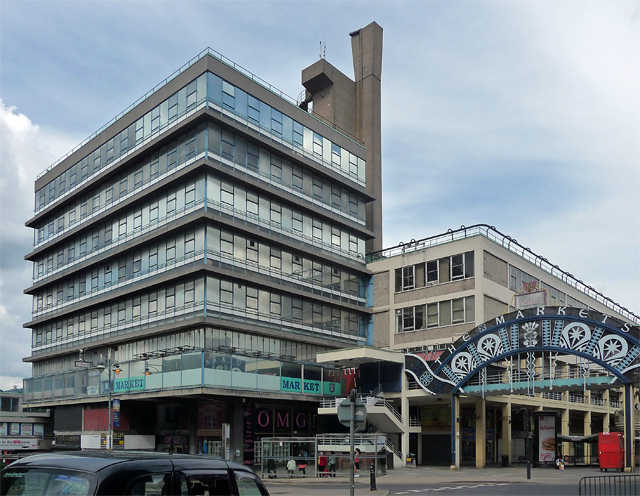
Castle Market

Castle Market was an indoor market in Sheffield city centre, England. The building lay in the north-east of the present city centre, on Waingate, by the River Don, and was built on top of the remains of Sheffield Castle, which could still be seen via guided tours. The market closed in 2013 when the Moor Market opened on The Moor, further south in Sheffield city centre, and demolition began in 2015.

== Description ==
The oldest part of the building was the Fish and Vegetable Market, constructed in the inter-war period and opened in 1930. The remainder of the building was constructed by J. Stuart Mackie and Andrew Derbyshire under the auspices of J. L. Womersley between 1960 and 1965. It had two main floors, both of which included small shops and stalls, and each accessible from street level.

Other stores faced on to the surrounding streets, while a gallery one, floor above the main part of the market, contained several more shops, and access to an office building surmounting the structure. The gallery was linked by bridges across Exchange Street to further above-ground shopping areas.

== Replacement and site redevelopment ==
The whole Castle markets area has been the subject of redevelopment proposals since the 1980s, with part of the adjacent area being redeveloped with a hotel, multi-storey car park and several new office blocks in a development known as "The Square" by Carillion. The original scheme to replace the markets fell victim to the 1990s recession. A new markets building opened on The Moor in 2013, which is a partnership between the council and private developers. The multi-storey car park for the Moor Market scheme has been built on Eyre Street.

Part of the council's current plans for the Castle Market was to demolish the existing complex and open up a pedestrian route from the city centre to the Victoria Docks area and the new Riverside Quarter, now that the ring road has been diverted.
