= Sheffield Cathedral =

Church in Sheffield, South Yorkshire, England

Coordinates: 53°22′59″N 1°28′10″W

- Cathedral Church of St Peter and St Paul
- Sheffield Cathedral South Front

- Location within Sheffield
- OS grid reference: SK 35387 87511
- Location: Sheffield, South Yorkshire
- Country: England
- Denomination: Church of England
- Previous denomination: Roman Catholic
- Website: sheffieldcathedral.org

Architecture
- Architect(s): Flockton & Gibbs (1870s); Charles Nicholson (1936–48); George Pace and Ansell & Bailey (1960–66)
- Style: Gothic, Modernist
- Years built: c. 1200–1966

Specifications
- Height: 49 metres (161 ft) to the tip of the spire

Administration
- Province: York
- Diocese: Sheffield

Clergy
- Bishop: Peter Wilcox
- Dean: Abi Thompson

The Cathedral Church of St Peter and St Paul, Sheffield, also known as Sheffield Cathedral, is the cathedral church for the Church of England diocese of Sheffield, England. Originally a parish church, it was elevated to cathedral status when the diocese was created in 1914. Sheffield Cathedral is one of five Grade I listed buildings in the city, along with the Town Hall, Abbeydale Industrial Hamlet, and the parish churches at Ecclesfield and Bradfield.

The cathedral is located on Church Street in the city centre, close to the head of Fargate. Construction of the earliest section of the cathedral dates back to c. 1200, with the newest construction completed in 1966; the building is an unusual mixture of medieval and modern architecture. Cathedral tram stop, located outside the front churchyard, opened in 1994 and is today served by all four lines of the South Yorkshire Supertram network. Most recently, the cathedral underwent an interior and exterior refurbishment in 2013–2014.

Sheffield Cathedral was damaged in a fire on 14 May 2020, an investigation into which is ongoing; a 40-year-old woman has been arrested and charged with arson. The fire destroyed a portion of the cathedral used by a homelessness charity. A previous fire caused damage to the cathedral belltower in 1979.

== History ==
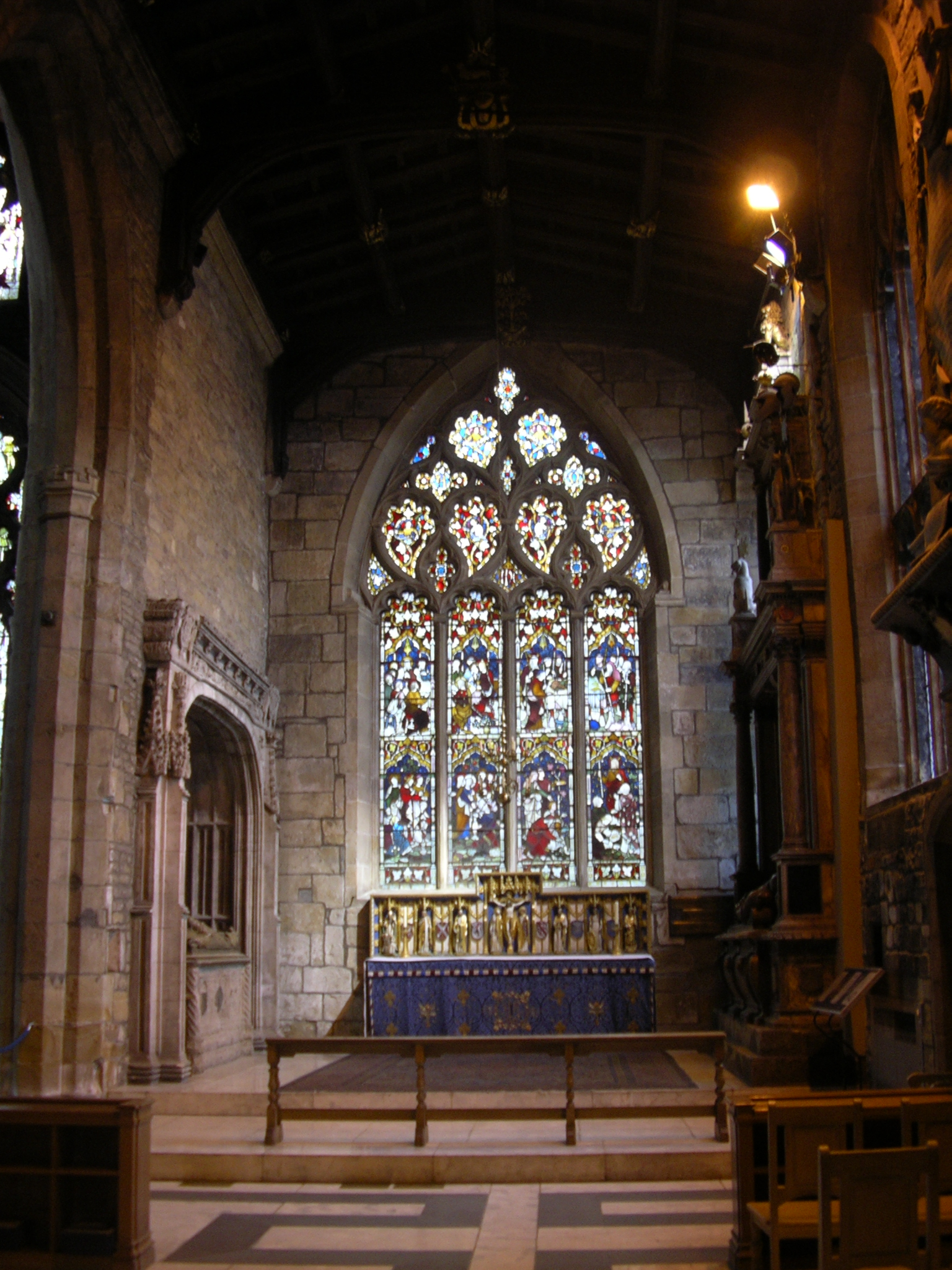
The Shrewsbury Chapel

The site of the cathedral has a long history of Christian use. The shaft of the 9th-century Sheffield Cross, believed to have formerly been sited here, is now held by the British Museum. It is probable that Sheffield's parish church, a satellite of Worksop Priory, was constructed here in the 12th century by William de Lovetot at the opposite end of the town to Sheffield Castle. This established the area of the parish of Sheffield, unchanged until the 19th century. This church was burnt down in 1266 during the Second Barons' War against King Henry III.

Another parish church was completed in 1280, but this church was mostly demolished and rebuilt about 1430 on a cruciform floor plan. The Shrewsbury Chapel was added in the next century, and a vestry chapel (now the Chapel of Saint Katherine) was added in 1777. The north and south walls of the nave were rebuilt in 1790–93 and a major restoration by Flockton & Gibbs, which included the addition of new north and south transepts, was completed in 1880. The church was originally dedicated to Saint Peter, but from some time after the reformation into the 19th century it was dedicated to Holy Trinity; it has since been dedicated to both Saint Peter and Saint Paul.

The parish of Sheffield was subdivided into smaller parishes in 1848. The church is still the parish church for the smaller Parish of Sheffield, but in 1914 it was also made the cathedral church for the newly created Diocese of Sheffield. Plans were drafted by Charles Nicholson to extend the church and reorient it on its axis, but due to World War II these were greatly scaled down. The resulting additions leave the church an awkward shape in plan, but with an impressive south elevation.

=== 1979 fire ===
During the early hours of 17 July 1979, a major fire broke out in the belltower of Sheffield Cathedral. The fire began inside the belfry, and subsequently spread down the tower to the ground floor and upwards to the clockroom. At least 35 firefighters from Division Street fire station tackled the fire, narrowly preventing the destruction of the cathedral spire and containing the lower portion of the fire to the belltower and surrounding structures. Thousands of pounds worth of damage was caused by the fire, but Cathedral's bells cast in 1970 survived. Additionally, burst water pipes caused flooding of the choir stalls, adding to the damage. In the Ringing Room, fire damage was severe, with all records of the cathedral's bellringers dating back 600 years completely destroyed.

Despite severe damage to the contents of the belltower, the structure of the cathedral ultimately suffered only mild damage and the building was never in danger of collapse. The cathedral was back operational by 26 July 1979 at the latest, according to photographs showing the ringing of the remaining bells on this date. Following police investigation of two phone calls made to the Sheffield Star newspaper the previous evening, warning that the cathedral was being set on fire, the cause of the fire was determined to be arson, although no perpetrator was ever found.

=== 2015 Royal Maundy ===
On Thursday 2 April 2015, the Royal Maundy service was held inside Sheffield Cathedral. As is tradition, the Queen (aged 89 at the time) distributed specially-minted Maundy money to 89 men and 89 women from the Sheffield area of state pension age or above. Recipients were handed two leather pouches, containing Maundy money equivalent in value to 89 pence. It was the first time the Royal Maundy service had ever been carried out in South Yorkshire. More than 12,000 people travelled to Sheffield to witness the service.

=== 2020 fire ===
A fire broke out at Sheffield Cathedral during the evening of 14 May 2020; emergency services were called to the cathedral around 18:00 BST after smoke was spotted coming from the side of the cathedral facing Campo Lane. The fire was attended by South Yorkshire Fire and Rescue crews from Sheffield Central fire station on Eyre Street, and extinguished by around 21:40 the same evening. The cathedral was empty at the time, and there were no injuries. A joint investigation between the police and fire service was undertaken, with the cause of the fire believed to be arson after a smashed window was found at the rear of the cathedral.

The fire caused damage to the interior of the cathedral. Smoke damage affected the entire structure, including the many stained glass windows. The fire is believed to have been started deliberately in a pile of clothes that had been donated to the Cathedral Archer Project, a homelessness charity which occupies part of the cathedral site. The fire destroyed the entire contents of the rooms used by the charity, but was prevented from spreading to other parts of the cathedral.

South Yorkshire Police arrested a 40-year-old woman in connection with the cathedral fire, charging her with arson with reckless endangerment, burglary and assault of an emergency worker. The woman was accused of spitting at two police officers as they arrested her, which was treated with added severity in the context of the COVID-19 pandemic in the United Kingdom.

The Cathedral Archer Project charity temporarily reduced operations in the aftermath of the fire, as much of their donated stock had been destroyed; increased donations from the public after the fire later allowed them to continue working from a temporary base. Prior to the fire, the charity had been distributing around 180 free meals to homeless people in Sheffield city centre every day, including during the COVID-19 pandemic.

== Art and architecture ==
The east end of the current church is the oldest. In the east wall of the sanctuary there are stones from the 13th-century church. Dating from the 15th century are the sanctuary and chancel. The 15th-century cruciform church also included lofts and a rood chapel but these were ordered to be removed by Elizabeth I. Their scars can be seen on the walls.

The chancel roof likely dates to the 16th century and is a hammerbeam roof with gilded angels. The outstretched wings are a modern gift from the 1960s by George Bailey.

Recumbent effigy of George Talbot, 4th Earl of Shrewsbury, and his two wives

In the 1770s, rebuilding included the addition of tracery into the windows and a resurfacing of the walls with moorstone. The addition of the vestry chapel of St Katherine destroyed the cruciform shape of the plan. The Shrewsbury Chapel was constructed in order to house the Tudor monuments of the Earls of Shrewsbury. The altarpiece in the chapel is considered medieval in date. On the south wall of the Shrewsbury Chapel is the alabaster monument to George Talbot, 6th Earl of Shrewsbury with its architectural surround, armoured effigy and Latin inscription. Several members of the family are buried in the vault. The monument on the left towards the sanctuary is to George Talbot, 4th Earl of Shrewsbury. It is made of fine marble, carved in an Italian style to depict the Earl and his two wives in positions of prayer. They are both fine examples of Tudor monuments. The east window is a monument to James Montgomery.

In the 1880s further reconstruction and rebuilding removed the galleries, moved the organ to the north transept to clear the chancel, and installed new oak pews. The north and south transepts and west end were extended. A screen was constructed by local craftsmen for the Shrewsbury Chapel but was modified and moved to the north aisle in the 1900s. During later restoration work in 2013, it was discovered that a number of the Shrewsbury coffins were missing from the crypt.

Saint George's chapel, dedicated to the York and Lancaster Regiment

Sir Charles Nicholson's design in the 1900s called for a radical realignment of the church axis by 90 degrees. However, funds and World Wars forced the designs to change. Those changes were implemented throughout the 20th century. The bulk of the changes have affected the northern part of the cathedral, which was extensively expanded. Immediately to the north of the nave is the chapel of Saint George, which commemorates the York and Lancaster Regiment. It is furnished with regiment flags and a screen made up of the bayonets and swords of the first regiment. Under the chapel of St George is the vaulted crypt chapel of All Saints and the Te Deum window, which was designed by Christopher Webb. At the furthest north end is the Chapel of the Holy Spirit with a four-part vaulting system and a painted screen. The main entrance of the church is at the expanded west end, added in 1966 when the church was rededicated. The baptism font is at this end. The lantern tower was an earlier addition to improve light but its glass was replaced by an abstract design designed by Amber Hiscott in 1998–99. In September 2010 it was announced that the cathedral would be applying for a £980,000 Heritage Lottery Fund grant to fund a £1.25 million scheme to make the building more attractive to visitors.

Lantern tower

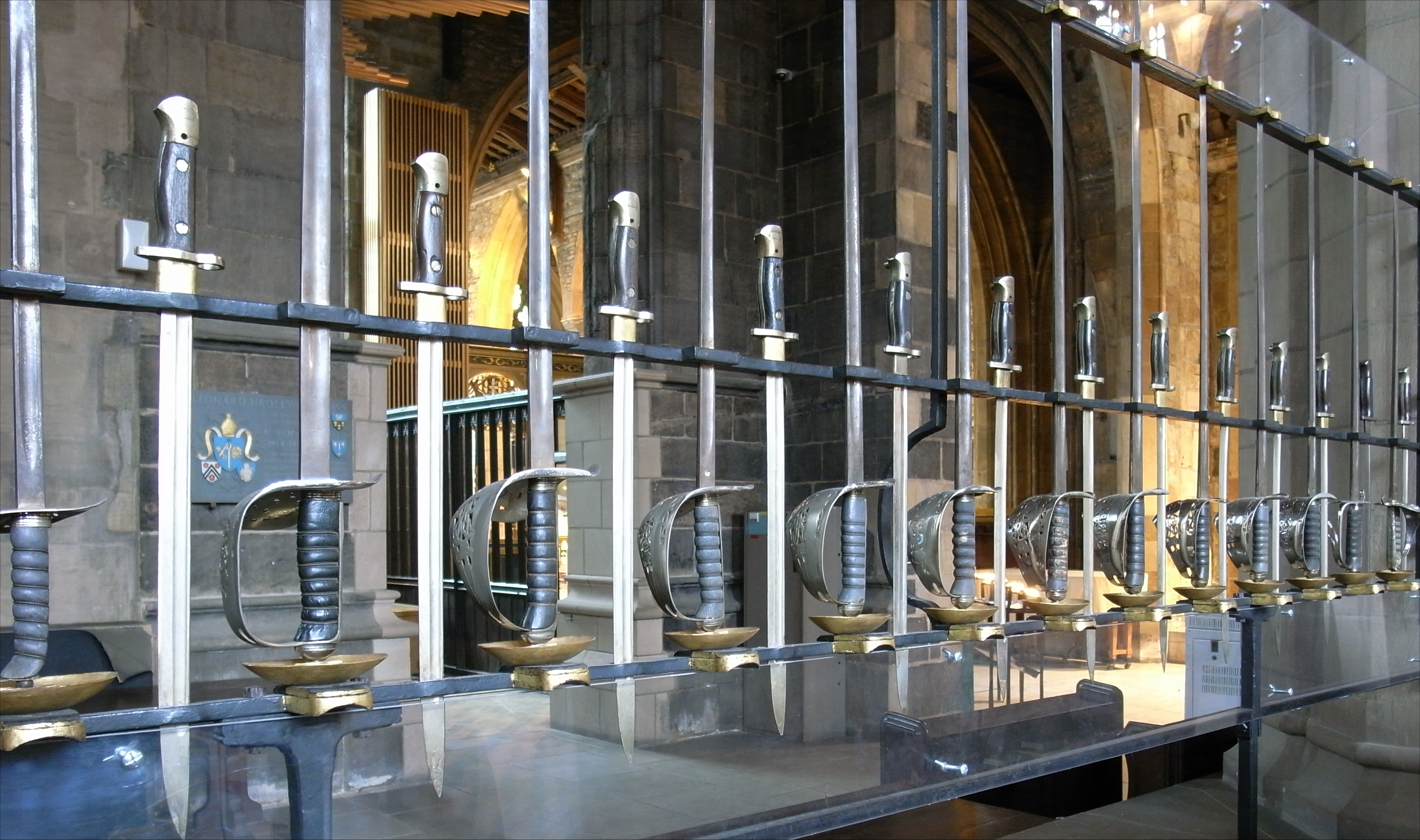
Screen of bayonets and swords in St George's Chapel

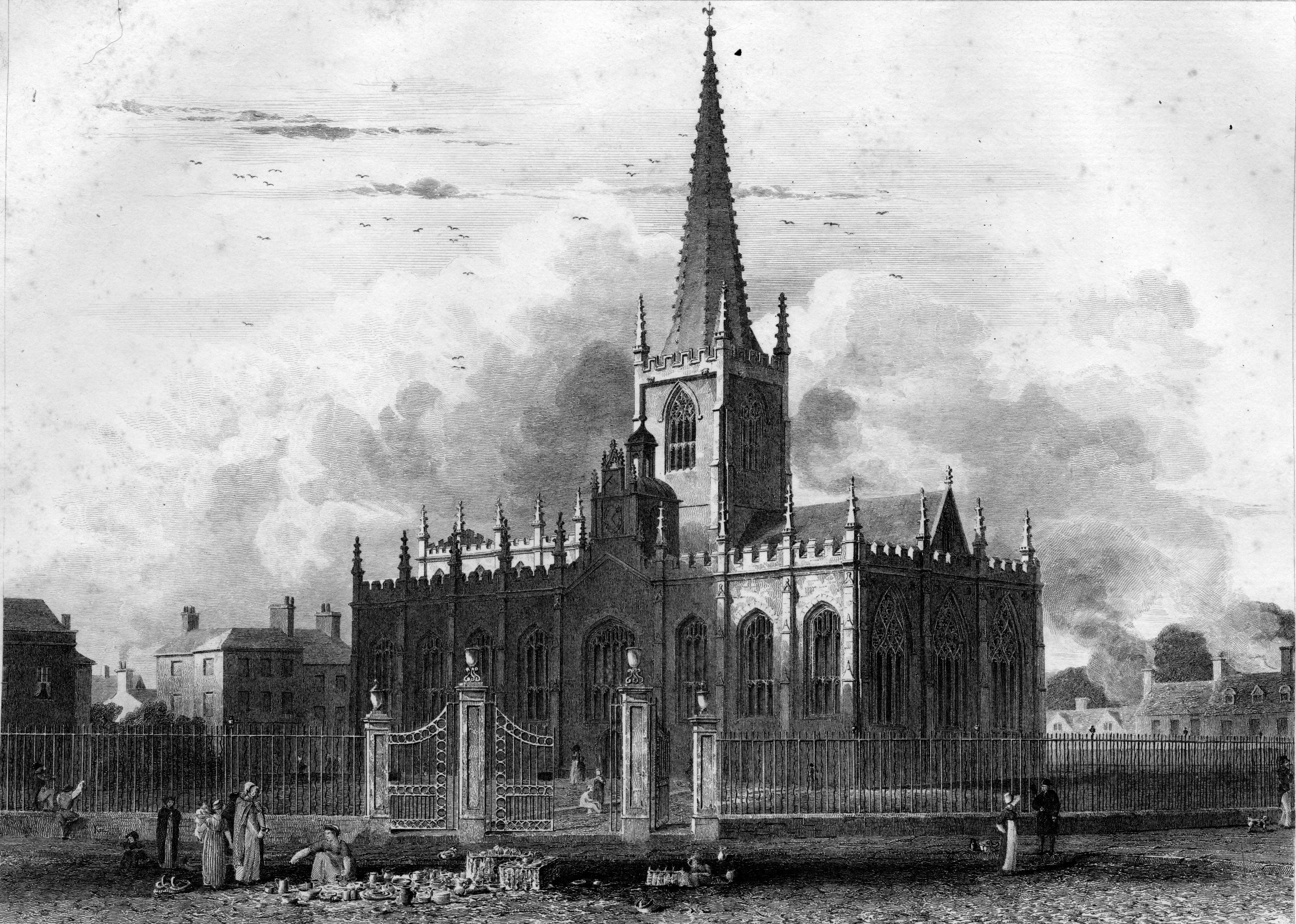
Sheffield Parish Church in 1819

Sheffield Cathedral nave in 2026

== Dean and chapter ==
As of 1 December 2021:

- Dean – Abi Thompson (since 6 November 2021 installation)
- Vice-dean & canon missioner – Keith Farrow (canon & missioner since March 2014; vice-dean since 1 December 2019)
- Canon residentiary & interim canon precentor – Geoffrey Harbord (canon since 21 October 2020 installation; interim precentor since 9 October 2021)
- Minor canon precentor – Daniel Wyman (to be installed in October 2024)

== Music ==
=== Choir ===
On 22 July 2020, the Sheffield Cathedral chapter announced the closure of the cathedral choir. The choir contained around 40 members and was composed of adult lay clerks and choral scholars and girl and boy choristers from various local schools. The chapter stated the closure was "in order to create a Music Department and Choir ready for the exciting future of the mixed urban community in which we live and work", and that the chapter is "committed to retaining the distinctive choral life of an Anglican cathedral, drawing fully on our long heritage of music-making". The closure was received negatively by the national media.

=== Organ ===
The pipe organ by N. P. Mander Ltd was decommissioned in 1998 with a view to a long-term replacement with another pipe organ. This had not occurred by 2020, when a digital organ by Phoenix Organs was being used. In 2008 negotiations were undertaken with Warrington Borough Council to purchase their Cavaillé-Coll organ from the Parr Hall, but these failed in 2011.

=== Organists ===
- 1805 John Mather
- 1810 Jonathan Blewitt
- 1811 Robert Bennett
- 1819 John Camidge
- 1819 Mr Gledhill
- 1820 Joseph Bottomley
- 1860 George Henry Smith
- 1875 Thomas Tallis Trimnell
- 1886 Edwin H. Lemare
- 1892 Thomas William Hanforth
- 1937 Reginald Tustin Baker
- 1966 Graham Hedley Matthews
- 1991 Paul Brough
- 1994 Simon Lole
- 1997 Neil Taylor
- 2016 Joshua Hales (acting)
- 2017 Thomas Corns
- 2019 Joshua Stephens (acting)
- 2020 Joshua Stephens (appointed March, resigned June)
- 2020 Ian Seddon (acting)
- 2023 Chris Why (acting)
- 2023 Thomas Daggett (Director of Music and Schools Singing Programme)

== Change ringing ==
As of 2017, the cathedral has 12 bells hung for change ringing, including a flat sixth bell and an Extra Treble. The bells are rung regularly for practice on Thursday and for Sunday services, in the morning and the evening. Also hanging in the cathedral is the stainless steel ship's bell from HMS Sheffield.

== Cathedral Archer Project ==
The Cathedral Archer Project is a homelessness charity which operates from rooms around the rear of the cathedral, with a separate entrance from Campo Lane. The charity was founded in 1989, following a decade of economic decline and rising homelessness in Sheffield following the collapse of the local steelworks and coal-mining industries. In 2007, the charity moved into the refurbished rooms to the rear of the cathedral that they occupy today; the rooms include shower and laundry facilities, computer access, lounge areas and a full kitchen for the use of Sheffield's homeless.

In 2013, the charity received Investing in Volunteers status. The Archer Project was the official charity of the Sheffield Eagles rugby league side for the 2018 season. The charity has also worked closely with schools, including a formal fundraising partnership with Dronfield Henry Fanshawe School's sixth form college.

The rooms used by the Archer Project at Sheffield Cathedral were destroyed by fire in an arson attack on 14 May 2020. The charity had previously been distributing 180 free meals per day to the city's homeless amid the COVID-19 pandemic. More than £22,000 was raised for the charity within 24 hours of the fire, including a £1,000 donation from Sheffield Wednesday football club.

== Access ==
Sheffield Cathedral has its own stop on the South Yorkshire Supertram network called Cathedral. Located in front of the cathedral at the edge of the churchyard, it is one of three city centre tram stops served by all four lines, and as such can be accessed from any other stop on the network. The tram stop was opened on 17 February 1995. Tram-train services between Cathedral and Parkgate commenced on 25 October 2018.

Preceding station	South Yorkshire Supertram	Following station
City Hall towards Middlewood	Yellow Route	Castle Square towards Meadowhall Interchange
City Hall towards Malin Bridge	Blue Route	Castle Square towards Halfway
Terminus	Purple Route	Castle Square towards Herdings Park
Terminus	Tram-train Route	Castle Square towards Parkgate

Beyond the tram platforms is Church Street, which since the construction of the tram network now runs westbound only from High Street to West Street. There are two bus stops on Church Street, serving local bus services 7a, 30/30a, 51 and 52/52a as of May 2020. There is no on-street parking on the streets directly surrounding the cathedral; the nearest car park is located on Campo Lane a short walk away, operated by National Car Parks.

== Vicars ==
Vicars of Sheffield from 1482:

1482: John Plesaunce
1501: Thomas Cundall
1512: Thomas Stokks
1519: Thomas Wode
1534: Robert Gawthorpe
1558/9: Richard Hayward
1567: John Atkyn
1569: Robert Holland
1597: Thomas Toller
1635: John Bright
1643: Edward Browne
1644: Thomas Birkbeck
1654: James Fisher
1662: Edward Browne
1662: John Lobley
1681: Charles Wilson
1695: Nathan Drake
1713: John Dossie
1754: James Wilkinson
1805: Thomas Sutton
1851: Thomas Sale
1873: Rowley Hill
1877: Post merged with Archdeacon of Sheffield
1931: Post merged with Provost of Sheffield

Church monument to George Talbot, 6th Earl of Shrewsbury

== Burials ==
- George Talbot, 6th Earl of Shrewsbury
- George Talbot, 4th Earl of Shrewsbury
- Anne Hastings, Countess of Shrewsbury, his first wife (predeceased him)
- Elizabeth Walden (1491 – July 1567), his second wife
- Mary Percy, Countess of Northumberland
- Revd Arthur Herbert Procter, VC recipient (ashes)

== See also ==
- Cathedral Church of St Marie, Sheffield (Roman Catholic)
- History of Sheffield
- Listed buildings in Sheffield
- List of works by George Pace

Records
Preceded by Not known	Tallest building in Sheffield; 1430 – 1850	Succeeded by Cathedral Church of St Marie; 59 m (195 ft)
