= Sheffield Gang Wars =

Conflict among criminal gangs in England

- Date: Late 19th century/ Early 20th century to 1928
- Location: Sheffield, South Yorkshire, England
- Result: Disbanding of mass gangs within South Yorkshire region and the dissolution of Special Duties Squad

Parties
Mooney Gang, Parks Brigade, Red Silks, White Silks	West Riding of Yorkshire Constabulary

The Sheffield Gang Wars is an umbrella term used to describe a large period between the 19th and 20th centuries in which the City of Sheffield saw a rise in criminal gang activity. The notoriety of some gangs led to the formation of the 'Special Duties Squad' by Percy Sillitoe.

Other UK cities have historically had more widespread violence, mostly concentrated in dense urban areas such as London, Manchester and Liverpool and more notorious criminal gangs such as the Peaky Blinders of Birmingham also exist, but the sheer brutality of Sheffield's gangs earned the city the nickname 'Little Chicago', in reference to gang culture within Chicago in the United States during the same period.
