= William de Lovetot =

Anglo-Norman baron

William de Lovetot, Lord of Hallamshire, possibly descended from the Norman Baron Ricardus Surdus, was an Anglo-Norman Baron from Huntingdonshire, often credited as the founder of Sheffield, England.

It is unknown when de Lovetot acquired an interest in the manor of Hallamshire, but by the early twelfth century (in the reign of Henry I) he was in possession of Hallam, Attercliffe, Sheffield, Grimesthorpe, Greasbrough and Worksop. He also had interests in Handsworth, Treeton, and Whiston . He founded a priory at Worksop c.1103, St. Mary's Church at Handsworth, and may have founded the parish church in Sheffield at around this time.

Lovetot is credited with the building of a motte and bailey castle in Sheffield. Along with the castle, a hospital was established at what is still called "Spital Hill", a mill was built beside the River Don, and a bridge called Lady's Bridge was constructed where there had previously only been a ford across the river. Little is known of Sheffield prior to Lovetot, but these developments established Sheffield as the main town in the Hallamshire area.

William had four sons, with his wife Emma; Richard, Nigel, Henry and Hugh.

Following the death of William de Lovetot the manor of Hallamshire passed to his elder son, Richard de Lovetot, and then to Richard's son, William de Lovetot, before being passed to Gerard de Furnival by his marriage to Maud de Lovetot in about 1204.

== See also ==
- History of Sheffield
- Timeline of Sheffield history
