= Sheffield Castle =

Limited remains of a castle in Sheffield, England

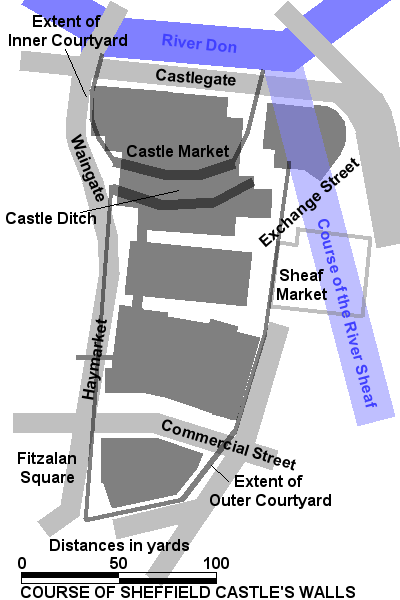
The plan of Sheffield Castle in relation to current buildings.

Sheffield Castle was a castle in Sheffield, England, constructed at the confluence of the River Sheaf and the River Don, possibly on the site of a former Anglo-Saxon long house, and dominating the early town. A motte and bailey castle had been constructed on the site at some time in the century following the Norman Conquest of England in 1066. This was destroyed in the Second Barons' War. Construction of a second castle, this time in stone, began four years later in 1270.

Mary, Queen of Scots was held prisoner in this castle and its associated estates at various times during the 14 years between 1570 and 1584, alternating with other properties of George Talbot, 6th Earl of Shrewsbury. The castle was held by Royalist forces for part of the English Civil War, and was surrendered to the Parliamentarians in 1644 following a short siege. Its demolition was ordered soon after, and the castle was razed.

There are no known surviving drawings or plans of the castle, but excavations in the 1920s revealed stone foundations from the castle begun in 1270 as well as evidence of earlier structures. Further architectural investigation was possible in 2015, following the demolition of the 20th-century market which had been built on top of the ruins.

== Background ==
Sheffield Castle was located at the confluence of the River Sheaf and the River Don (53°23′5″N 1°27′48″W), on the western bank of the Sheaf and the southern bank of the Don. The rivers provided defence to the north and east and there was a moat on the south and western sides of the castle. This site was largely covered by Castle Market which was demolished in 2015.

Early activity on the site is suggested by several finds including a Bronze Age flint horseshoe scraper, and in the Roman period Samian Ware and Silchester pottery, discovered during excavations in the 1920s.

The site of the castle is the place where the earliest settlement at Sheffield was founded sometime in the second half of the 1st millennium AD. The Domesday Book of 1086 states that, prior to the Norman Conquest of England in 1066, Waltheof II, Earl of Northumbria, had an aula (hall) in the manor of Hallam. In the same entry, it is reported that the manor of Sheffield—which had been part of Hallam—was under the Lordship of Sweyn at the time of the conquest. It has been speculated that Waltheof's aula or Sweyn's stronghold may have been at this site, and excavations between 1927 and 1930 were claimed to have uncovered evidence of a Saxon structure. However, on the basis of three separate extracts from the Domesday Survey it can be shown that the manors of Hallam, Attercliffe, and Sheffield were three distinct and separate entities at the time of the Survey and beyond; and that the village of Hallam and Waltheof's aula could only have been located in the manor of Hallam, and not Sheffield.

The studies conducted by A. L. Armstrong during the archaeological investigations of the late 1920s provide evidence that the Saxon remains were not those of Waltheof's aula. Armstrong's description suggests that the timbers were cut down to the level of the surrounding earth, burned, and the area immediately cleared to make way for the construction of the Lovetot castle (circa 1100), some two decades after the destruction of Waltheof's aula.

== William de Lovetot's castle ==
The construction of the first castle at Sheffield following the Norman invasion of England is usually attributed to William de Lovetot, an Anglo-Norman Baron from Huntingdonshire, meant to keep the local rebellious populace subdued after the Harrying of the North. De Lovetot acquired the lordship of the manor of Hallamshire (including Sheffield) in the early twelfth century during the reign of Henry I. The earliest known reference to a castle at Sheffield is a return made by Ralph Murdac, sheriff of Derbyshire, concerning the wardship of Maud de Lovetot (the great granddaughter of William), dating from around 1188.

It is thought that this castle was a wooden motte and bailey type. Maud de Lovetot married Gerard de Furnival in 1204 and the castle and town of Sheffield passed to the Furnival family. Gerard de Furnival's grandson, Thomas, supported the Royalist cause during the Second Barons' War of 1264–1267. In 1266 a party of anti-monarchy barons, led by John de Eyvill, marching from north Lincolnshire to Derbyshire passed through Sheffield and destroyed the town, burning the church and castle.

== Thomas de Furnival's castle ==
In 1270 Thomas de Furnival obtained a charter from King Henry III to build a castle at Sheffield. Thomas died soon after the castle was completed and was buried in the castle. In 1707 a report was published stating that, when the castle was demolished in 1648, a large flat stone was found engraved I Lord Furnival; I built this castle-hall; And under this wall; Within this tomb was my burial.

De Furnival's castle was built of stone, and extended from the river Sheaf to Waingate and from the river Don to Dixon Lane, an area of about 4.2 acres (17,000 m^{2}; 180,000 ft^{2}). A 2,461-acre (9.96 km^{2}; 3.845 mi^{2}) park was attached to the castle, it extended from the castle to Gleadless to the south and Handsworth to the east.

== 16th century ==
In 1516, George Talbot, 4th Earl of Shrewsbury, built the alternative residence of Sheffield Manor in the park. Some letters regarding the captivity of Mary, Queen of Scots, mention life in castle. An escape plan made for her in February 1571 fell through when she was moved from the Manor to the Castle. When she was at Sheffield in December 1571, she was able to walk on the lead roof of the castle, in the Earl's large dining room, and in the courtyard. The castle was damaged on 26 February 1574 when Sheffield suffered an earthquake damaging the apartment where Mary Queen of Scots was held prisoner.

== Destruction of the castle ==
On 11 October 1642, as England moved towards civil war, the town and castle were seized by Parliamentarians under Sir John Gell. In April 1643, Royalists under Earl of Newcastle entered Yorkshire and took Leeds, Wakefield, and Rotherham before approaching Sheffield. The Parliamentarians abandoned Sheffield for Derbyshire, and the Royalists captured the castle without fighting. Newcastle left a garrison at the castle commanded by Sir William Savile. According to Margaret Cavendish, Newcastle's wife:

…he marched with his army to Sheffield, another market-town of large extent, in which there was an ancient castle; which when the enemies forces that kept the town came to hear of, being terrified with the fame of my Lord's hitherto victorious army, they fled away from thence into Derbyshire, and left both town and castle (without any blow) to my Lord's mercy; and though the people in the town were most of them rebelliously affected, yet my Lord so prudently ordered the business, that within a short time he reduced most of them to their allegiance by love, and the rest by fear, and recruited his army daily; he put a garrison of soldiers into the castle, and fortified it in all respects, and constituted a gentleman of quality, [Sir William Savile knight and baronet] governor both of the castle, town and country; and finding near that place some ironworks, he gave present order for the casting of iron cannon for his garrisons, and for the making of other instruments and engines of war.

— Margaret Cavendish, The Life of William Duke of Newcastle

Savile passed control of Sheffield and the castle to his deputy, Major Thomas Beaumont, who held them until August 1644. That month the Earl of Manchester sent 1,200 Parliamentarians troops under Major-General Crawford and Colonel Pickering to recapture Sheffield. Initially, the besiegers artillery could not breach the walls; their largest gun was a demi-culverin. On General Crawford's request, Lord Fairfax reinforced the siege with a demi-cannon (the Queen's pocket-pistoll) and a whole culverin. These extra cannon breached the walls and the Royalists surrendered under the following terms:

Articles of Agreement, between the commanders authorised by Major-General Crawford, and Major Thomas Beaumont, Governor of Sheffield Castle, for surrendering the same to the Right Honourable the Earl of Manchester.

- ART. I. The Castle, with all the fire-arms, ordnance, and ammunition, all their furniture of war, and all their provisions (except what is in the following articles), to be delivered to Major-General Crawford to morrow, by three o'clock in the afternoon, being the 11th of this instant August, without any diminution or embezzlement.
- ART. II. That the Governor, and all other officers, shall march out of the Castle upon the delivery thereof, with their drums and colours, and each his own horse saddled, sword and pistol, to Pomfret Castle, or wheresoever they please, with a sufficient convoy or pass, for their security; the common soldiers to their own home, or where they please.
- ART. III. That all officers and soldiers, so marching out, on this agreement, shall have liberty to carry with them their wives, children, and servants, with their own goods, properly belonging to them, and shall have all convenient accommodation for carrying the same away.
- ART. IV. That the Lady Savill, and her children and family, with her own proper goods, shall and may pass with coaches, horses, and waggons to Thornhill, or elsewhere, with a sufficient guard, befitting her quality; and without injury to any of their persons, or plundering any of their goods or otherwise. She, they, or any of them, to go or stay at their own pleasure, until she or they be in a condition to remove themselves.
- ART. V. That the gentlemen in the Castle being no soldiers, shall march out with each his own horse saddled, sword and pistol, and shall have liberty to remove their goods, and to live in their own house, or elsewhere, without molestation; they conforming to the ordinances of Parliament, and they shall have protection of the Earl of Manchester and Lords. And all officers and soldiers, who chuae to lay down their arms, shall have the same protection.
- ART. VI. That the governor, officers, soldiers, gentlemen, and all others who are by this agreement to carry their own goods with them, shall have a week's time for removing the same; and in the meantime, they are to be in the Castle, and secure from embezzlement. And this article is to be understood of all such goods as are at present within the Castle, or under the absolute command thereof.
- АRT. VII. That Kellam Homer, now living in the Castle, shall have liberty to remove his goods into the town, or elsewhere, without molestation.
- ART. VIII. That the governor, officers, gentlemen, and all other persons, shall (according to the articles above-mentioned) march out without injury or molestation.
- ART. IX. That hostages, such as Major Crawford shall approve, shall be delivered by the governor, upon signing the articles for delivery of the Castle, and safe return of the envoy; which hostages shall be returned safe, upon the performance thereof, unto such place as they desire.

Signed by us, Commissioners authorised by Major CRAWFORD, at Sheffield, this, 11th of August 1644.
J. PlCKERING
MARK GRIMSTON
WILLIAM HAMILTON

Signed by us, Commissioners authorised by Major ВEAUMONT, Governor of Sheffield Castle, this 11th of August 1644.
GABRIEL HEMSWORTH
SAM. SAVILL
THOS. ROBINSON

— Agreement for the surrender of Sheffield Castle, quoted in Hunter 1819, pp. 111–112.

The Lady Savile mentioned in the agreement was the widow of Sir William Savile. She was pregnant at the time of the siege, and went into labour the night after the castle was surrendered.

Following the siege Colonel John Bright of Carbrook Hall became governor of the castle before being reassigned as governor of the city of York. Control of Sheffield passed to Captain Edward Gill. The House of Commons ordered the castle to be made untenable on 30 April 1646, but then ordered its demolition on 13 July 1647. Despite considerable demolition work, in 1649 the Earl of Arundel repurchased Sheffield castle with the intention of restoring it, but the damage was too great and no restoration work was ever started. The castle was soon completely razed; the site was used as an orchard and then a bowling green before being built over.

Some of the stone from the castle was used in the construction of the now demolished Free Grammar School of King James of England, within the town of Sheffield, in the County of York, which was built on Townhead Street in 1648.

== Later history of the site ==
During the 18th and 19th centuries, a slaughterhouse existed on the site. The Fish and Vegetable Market existed on the site around 1930, and Castle Market was built on the site between 1959 and 1965 before eventually being demolished in 2015.

== Archaeological investigations and remains ==
=== 1920s ===
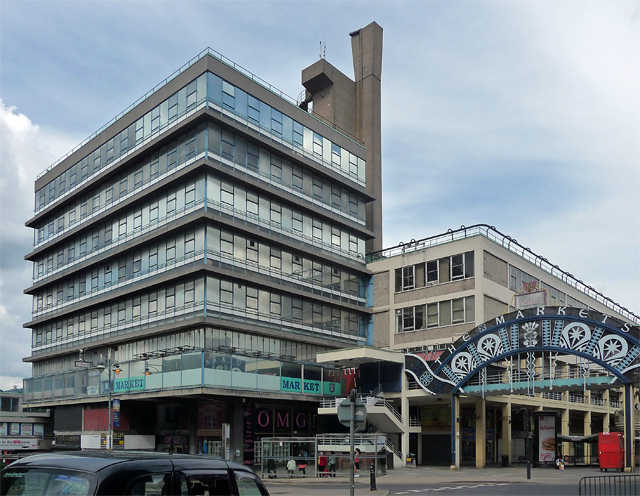
Castle Market occupied the site of the Norman Sheffield Castle.

An excavation led by Leslie Armstrong in 1927, before the construction of the Brightside and Carbrook Co-operative Society store, uncovered the base of one of the gateway bastion towers, as well as part of the gateway itself. These remains of the castle were once preserved underneath the city's Castle Market: they are Grade II listed and are open for viewing.

The visible remains were situated in two rooms below the now demolished Castle Market. One room was open to the public, pending booking of a tour, the other room was walled and the only access was via a manhole in the market's food court. The remaining ruins, approximately 32 feet above the River Don, are those of one of the gate towers, they represent a quarter of the Eastern tower.

=== 1999 to 2001 ===
More recent excavations in 1999 and 2001 by ARCUS, Sheffield University's archaeological research and consultancy unit, revealed the castle to have been much larger than had been thought: among the largest medieval castles in England. Drilling was done in the upper food court delivery yard and flag stones left in situ to mark boundaries of the castle.

A group of volunteers have formed the Friends of Sheffield Castle to research and promote the interests of the remains.

=== Castlegate redevelopment ===
Sheffield City Council announced plans in August 2014 to rebuild the entrance to the castle as part of a £5 million regeneration of the city's Castlegate area. The plan is dependent on raising the required funds; the council has committed £1 million to the project, and further financial support has come through a series of bids.

In July 2017 a £786,000 fund was announced to redevelop the Sheffield Castlegate area as a green corridor, including funding of a major archaeological dig. The excavation project was undertaken in August 2018 by Wessex Archaeology in cooperation with students from the University of Sheffield's archaeology department. A virtual reality model of the Castle, created by the University, was on display from 20 to 27 September 2018 at the Millennium Gallery.

The ruins of Sheffield Castle are scheduled to be placed on public display as part of the Castlegate regeneration project's new urban park, set for completion in late 2026.

== Notes ==
Citations

References

- Hey, David (2010). A History of Sheffield (3rd ed.). Lancaster: Carnegie Publishing Ltd. ISBN 978-1-85936-198-6.
- Hunter, Joseph (1819). Hallamshire. The History and Topography of the Parish of Sheffield in the County of York. London: Lackington, Hughes, Harding, Mayor & Jones. (wikisource)
- Moreland, John; Hadley, Dawn; Tuck, Ashley; Rajic, Milica (2020). Sheffield Castle: archaeology, archives, regeneration, 1927–2018. Heslington: White Rose University Press. doi:10.22599/SheffieldCastle. ISBN 9781912482290.
- Taylor, John, ed. (1879). "The Civil Wars". The Illustrated Guide to Sheffield and the Surrounding District. Sheffield: Pawson and Brailsford. pp. 30–32.
- Vickers, J. Edward MBE (1999). Old Sheffield Town. An Historical Miscellany (2nd ed.). Sheffield: The Hallamshire Press Limited. ISBN 1-874718-44-X.
- Waddington, Clive (January 2009). "Discovering Sheffield Castle: A Prospectus for Excavating and Presenting Sheffield's Lost Castle" (PDF). Archaeological Research Services, Ltd.
