= Old Queen's Head =

Coordinates: 53.380953°N 1.463073°W

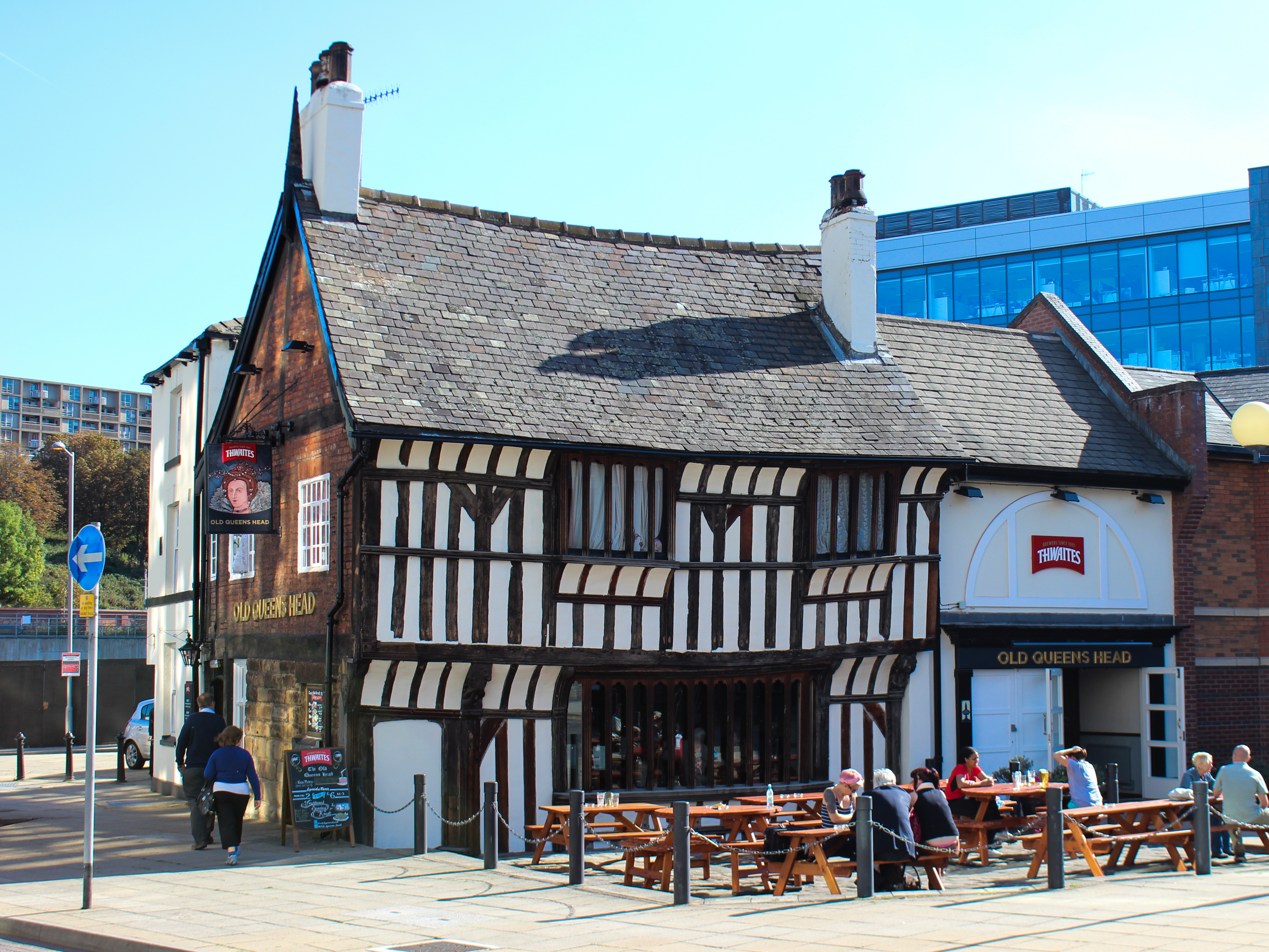
- West front of the Old Queen's Head

- Location within Sheffield
- Former names: The Hall at the Ponds

General information
- Type: pub
- Architectural style: Vernacular Tudor
- Location: Sheffield, South Yorkshire, 40 Pond Hill, S1 2BG, Sheffield, England
- Estimated completion: 1475
- Owner: Thwaites Brewery

Technical details
- Material: timber frame

Design and construction
- Designations: Grade II* listed

Other information
- Public transit: Sheffield Interchange; B P Sheffield station

The Old Queen's Head is a pub at 40 Pond Hill, Sheffield, South Yorkshire, England. It is a 15th-century timber framed building and the oldest surviving domestic building in Sheffield. It is now Grade II* listed.

== History ==
The Old Queens Head was built c. 1475. However, the earliest known written record of the building is in a 1582 inventory of the estate of George Talbot, 6th Earl of Shrewsbury that included the furnishings of this building, which was then called "The hawle at the Poandes" or "Hall i' th' Ponds".

As a part of the Earl's estate, the building may have been a banqueting hall for parties hunting wildfowl in the nearby ponds. These ponds, which formed in the area where the Porter Brook meets the River Sheaf, are now gone, but gave rise to the local names Pond Street, Pond Hill (formerly Pond Well Hill), and Ponds Forge.

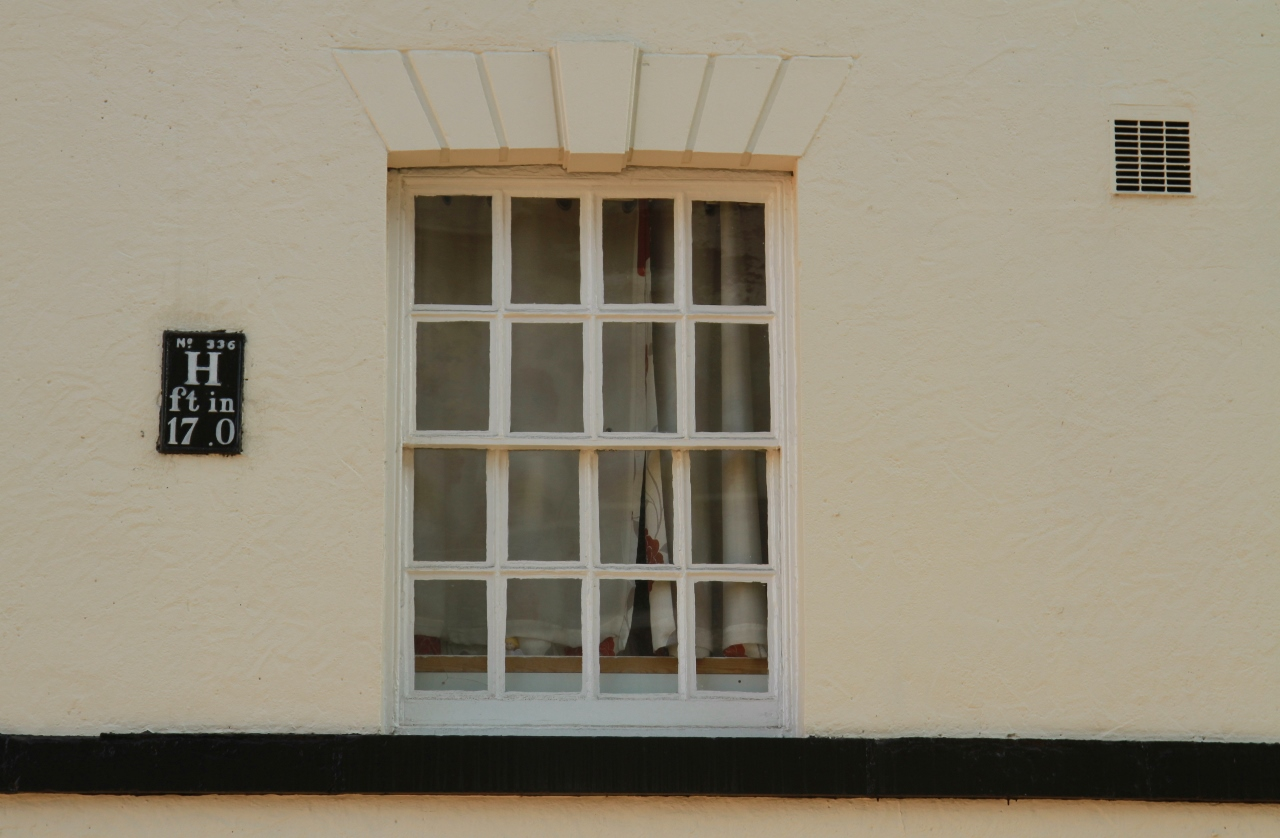
19th-century sash window on the north side of the building

By the beginning of the 19th century the building was being used as a house. In 1840 a pub called the Old Queen's Head was opened in the building next door. Sometime after 1862 the pub expanded into the former Hall i' th' Ponds. Late in the 19th century, alterations and additions were made to the rear of the building.

The Queen in the pub's current name is likely to refer to Mary, Queen of Scots, who was imprisoned in Sheffield from 1570 to 1584.

The building has been Grade II* listed since 1952. It was refurbished in 1993 when it was controlled by the Tom Cobleigh pub company. It was later controlled by Thwaites Brewery, and as of 2024 it is part of the WJS Pub Group.

== See also ==
- Listed buildings in Sheffield

== Sources ==
- Harman, R.; Minnis, J. (2004). Sheffield. Pevsner City Guides. New Haven & London: Yale University Press. p. 152. ISBN 0-300-10585-1.
- Hunter, Joseph (1819). "The Township of Sheffield". Hallamshire. The History and Topography of the Parish of Sheffield in the County of York. London: Lackington, Hughes, Harding, Mayor & Jones. p. 193.
- Olive, Martin (1994). "The Ponds". Central Sheffield. Images of England. Stroud: Tempus Publishing. pp. 31, 50. ISBN 0-7524-0011-8.
- Pevsner, Nikolaus; Radcliffe, Enid (revision) (1967) [1959]. Yorkshire the West Riding. The Buildings of England. Harmondsworth: Penguin Books. pp. 456–457. ISBN 0-14-071017-5.
