= Sheffield Cross =

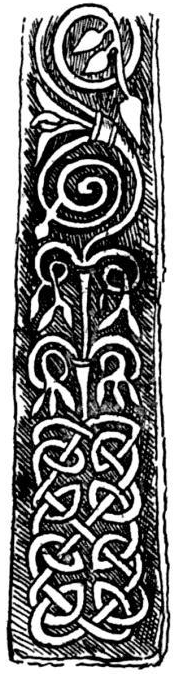
Engraving showing detail of one face of the Sheffield Cross

The Sheffield Cross is an Anglo-Saxon cross, dating from the early ninth century. It is the shaft of a stone high cross that was rediscovered hollowed out and in use as a quenching trough in a cutler's workshop in the Park district of Sheffield. John Walter Staniforth removed the cross and kept it in his garden, before it was later donated to the British Museum in 1924, where it is now kept. The shaft is carved with a vine motif, a figure with a bow and arrow placed amidst the tendrils; similar figures are found on the Ruthwell Cross and an ivory in the Victoria and Albert Museum, and their significance has been much discussed. The head of the cross is missing.

The style of the cross is Mercian, and it is the most northerly known example of this type. It resembles crosses from Bakewell and Eyam, and David Hey uses the similarity of the vine scrolls in the Eyam and Sheffield crosses to hypothesise a single craftsperson.

At the time of its discovery the prevailing theory was that the Cross originally stood on the future site of Sheffield Parish Church (now Sheffield Cathedral). A cross outside the church is recorded to have been demolished in 1570 during the English Reformation. Another theory holds that it was originally from Derbyshire.

Several crosses in Sheffield survived the Reformation, including the Market Cross, Irish Cross and Townhead Cross, but all are now lost.
