= Gerard de Furnival =

English knight

Sir Gerard Furnival (died 1219) was an English landowner and soldier.

== Origins ==
Born about 1179, he was the son of Sir Gerard Furnival, who had accompanied King Richard I on the Third Crusade to Palestine and is said to have fought there at the Siege of Acre in 1191.

== Career ==
Through marriage around 1199, he acquired considerable lands at Hallamshire in Yorkshire and at Worksop in Nottinghamshire. He joined the Fifth Crusade to Damietta in Egypt, where he is said to have died in 1219.

== Family ==
About 1199 he married Matilda de Lovetot, a great-granddaughter of William Lovetot, whose parents were William Lovetot and Maud FitzWalter. They had three sons, Thomas Furnival, Gerard Furnival, and William. Both Thomas and Gerard died taking part in the Barons' Crusade in 1241. His widow outlived her husband and two of her sons, dying at some point after 1258.
