= Studio 54 =

Broadway theater and former nightclub

- Gallo Opera House (1927–30); New Yorker Theatre (1930–33, 1939–42); Casino de Paree (1933–35); WPA Federal Music Theatre (1937–38); CBS Playhouse No. 4 (1942–49); CBS Studio 52 (1949–76); Nightclub Studio 54 (1977–80)
- Interactive map of Studio 54
- Address: 254 West 54th Street; Manhattan, New York; United States
- Coordinates: 40°45′51.7″N 73°59′1.6″W
- Owner: Roundabout Theatre Company
- Capacity: 1,006 (519 orchestra/487 mezzanine)
- Type: Broadway
- Production: The Rocky Horror Show
- Public transit: New York City Subway: 50th Street/Eighth Avenue (C and E); 50th Street/Broadway (1); Seventh Avenue/53rd Street (B, D, and E); 57th Street–Seventh Avenue (N, Q, R, and W)

Construction
- Opened: November 7, 1927 (99 years ago)
- Years active: 1927–1933, 1939–1940, 1998–present (as Broadway theater) 1977-1980 - Nightclub Studio 54
- Architect: Eugene De Rosa

Website
- roundabouttheatre.org

Studio 54 is a Broadway theater and former nightclub at 254 West 54th Street in the Midtown Manhattan neighborhood of New York City, New York, U.S. Opened as the Gallo Opera House in 1927, it served as a CBS broadcast studio in the mid-20th century. Steve Rubell and Ian Schrager opened the Studio 54 nightclub, retaining much of the former theatrical and broadcasting fixtures, inside the venue in 1977. Roundabout Theatre Company renovated the space into a Broadway house in 1998.

The producer Fortune Gallo announced plans for an opera house in 1926, hiring Eugene De Rosa as the architect. The Gallo Opera House opened November 8, 1927, but soon went bankrupt and was renamed the New Yorker Theatre. The space also operated as the Casino de Paree nightclub, then the Palladium Music Hall, before the Federal Music Project staged productions at the theater for three years starting in 1937. CBS began using the venue as a soundstage in 1942, then as a television studio until 1975.

Schrager and Rubell opened the Studio 54 nightclub on April 26, 1977, as disco was gaining popularity in the U.S. Infamous for its celebrity guest lists, quixotic entry policies, extravagant events, rampant drug use, and sexual hedonism including open sexual activity, Studio 54 closed in 1980 after Schrager and Rubell were convicted of tax evasion. A scaled-back version of the nightclub continued under new management before becoming the Ritz rock club in 1989, then the Cabaret Royale bar in 1994.

The Roundabout Theatre Company renovated the space in 1998 to relocate its production of the musical Cabaret, which ran at Studio 54 until 2004. The modern theater has since hosted multiple productions each season. The main auditorium, with 1,006 seats on two levels, is complemented by two sister cabaret venues: Upstairs at 54 on the second floor since 2001, and 54 Below in the basement since 2012. The heyday of the 1970s club features in numerous exhibitions, films, and albums, with memorabilia from the nightclub appearing at auctions.

== Design ==
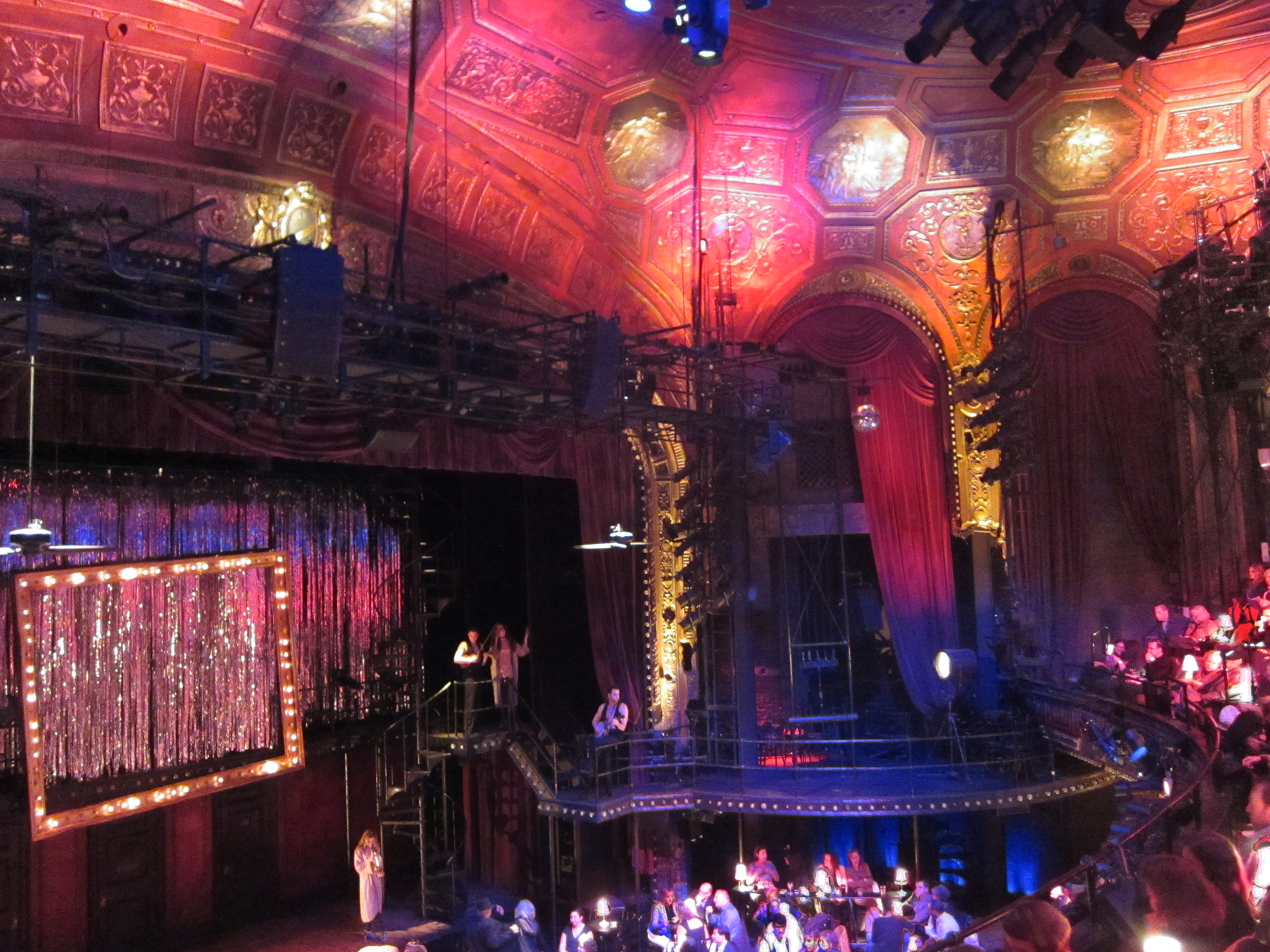
Interior of the theater during the production of the musical Cabaret

Studio 54 is located at 254 West 54th Street in the Midtown Manhattan neighborhood of New York City, New York, U.S. Designed by Eugene De Rosa as the Gallo Opera House, it contained 1,400 seats when it opened in 1927. De Rosa's original plans called for lounges, restrooms, and promenades on three stories, as well as an opera museum below the primary floors. By 1933, when it was being used as the Casino de Paree nightclub, the theater had 650 seats on the orchestra level and 500 seats in the balcony. CBS documents show that, when the theater was used as CBS Studio 52 in the mid-20th century, it had 828 seats on three levels: 312 in the orchestra, 371 in the balcony, and 145 in a mezzanine. The modern-day theater has 1,006 seats across two levels: 519 in the orchestra and 487 in the balcony. The theater contained nightclub tables during the late 20th century, which were removed in 1998 after Studio 54's re-conversion into a theater and replaced with raked seating.

Ida Louise Killam designed the original interior with a gold, blue, and rose palette. One early observer described the theater as having "a Roxy foyer and a Paramount promenade". The orchestra seats were originally divided by five aisles. The orchestra-level walls were clad with walnut, and the trimmings at balcony level and in the mezzanine lounge were also made of walnut. The vaulted ceiling contained a dome measuring 50 feet (15 m) across, as well as indirect lighting. This dome is decorated with medallions. According to CBS documents, Studio 54's proscenium arch measures 27 feet 0 inches (8.23 m) high and 43 feet 8 inches (13.31 m) wide. There was a fly system 58 feet (18 m) above the stage. Backstage were six dressing rooms, as well as a 15-by-40-foot (4.6 by 12.2 m) rehearsal space at stage left.

To avoid disrupting the construction of the New York City Subway's Eighth Avenue Line, structural engineer David M. Oltarsh placed the Gallo Opera House's foundation, orchestra, and balcony within an enclosure that was suspended from the theater building's roof. The modern mezzanine-level promenade has an exhibit with information on the theater's current production. The theater also contains a bar in its lobby, which is a tribute to the former Studio 54 nightclub.

=== 54 Below ===
The cabaret club 54 Below opened in Studio 54's basement on June 5, 2012. It was designed by architect Richard H. Lewis, set designer John Lee Beatty, lighting designer Ken Billington, and sound designer Peter Hylenski. A staircase from ground level leads to a rectangular room with leather and wood decorations, as well as a red, purple, and brown color palette. The room contains 140 seats in a cabaret-style arrangement and 16 seats in a bar to the right. Originally, 54 Below presented shows every day of the week, with 4,000 performances in its first five years. In partnership with musician Michael Feinstein, the club was renamed Feinstein's/54 Below in 2015; the club reverted to the name 54 Below when the partnership ended in July 2022.

=== Upstairs at Studio 54 ===
Josh Hadar of Allied Partners created a 175-seat cabaret space on the second floor, called Upstairs at Studio 54. The space opened in February 2001 and is accessed via its own entrance at ground level. This space was used exclusively for special events. Performances occurred during nights when plays were not being staged. The musical Newsical was staged there from October 2004 to April 2005.

== Early history ==
=== Gallo Opera House ===
In July 1926, theatrical impresario Fortune Gallo leased a site at 254 West 54th Street and hired Eugene De Rosa to design a 16-story office building at the site, with a 1,400-seat theater at its base. Z. D. Berry and Robert Podgur would build the venue at an estimated cost of $2 million. Gallo planned to present the San Carlo Grand Opera Company's productions at the theater during the autumn, renting it out for legitimate shows at other times. The venue was originally supposed to open in January 1927, but this was delayed because the opera company had an extended engagement in San Francisco. Prior to the venue's opening, Gallo transferred his interest in the San Carlo Company to his nephew Aurelio Gallo, allowing the elder Gallo to focus on operating the new theater.

The opera house opened on November 8, 1927, with the San Carlo Company's large-scale production of La bohème. The Gallo was one of three legitimate theaters to open in New York City during 1927; at the time, the city had over 200 legitimate theaters. The San Carlo Company performed for two weeks. A revival of the play Electra opened at the Gallo that December, followed the same month by Juno and the Paycock. A $660,000 mortgage was placed on the theater building in January 1928. The American Opera Company opened its season there the same month, performing there until March. Ballet Moderne also performed there for two weeks in April 1928.

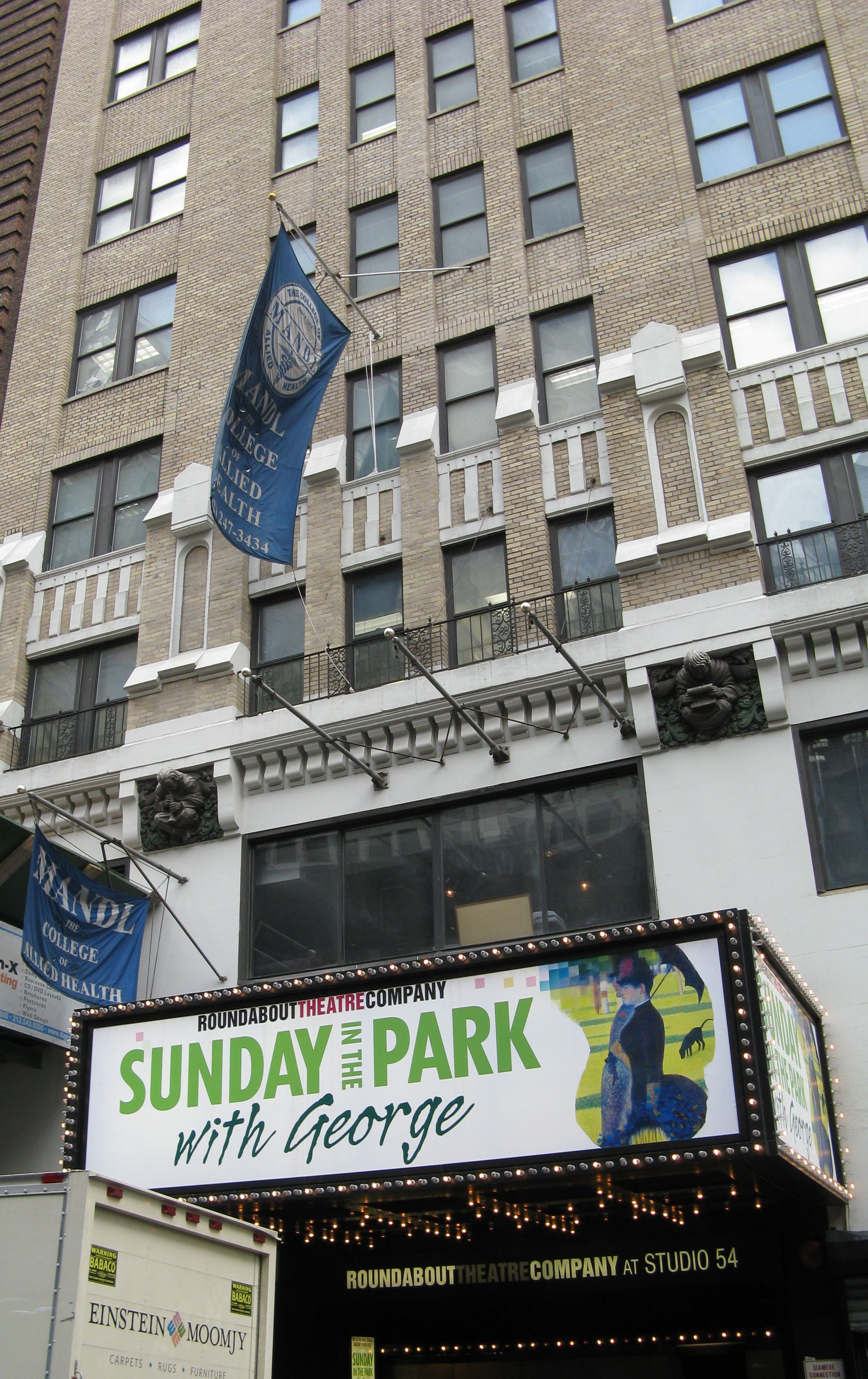
Studio 54, originally the Gallo Opera House, is placed within the base of an office building at 254 West 54th Street.

Philip Goodman leased the theater for five years in mid-1928. Goodman used the theater to stage a production of Laurence Stallings and Oscar Hammerstein II's musical Rainbow, which ran for less than a month in late 1928. In the meantime, the theater also hosted events such as dance performances, a violin recital, and a choir performance. Radiant Productions leased the theater in September 1929, with plans to present a dozen plays for three weeks each. Their first and only production, Ladies Don't Lie, was a critical failure. That October, Radiant transferred its lease to William R. Kane, who staged a short-lived revival of the comedy A Tailor-Made Man there. At a foreclosure auction in December 1929, the theater's mortgagee Hemphill Realty Corporation bought the theater for $1,045,000.

=== New Yorker Theatre ===
Gallo sold his lease to an unidentified buyer in January 1930, as he wanted to focus on operating a radio station. Richard Herndon took over as the theater's managing director, renaming it the New Yorker Theatre the next month. The first production at the renamed theater was the Henrik Ibsen play The Vikings, which had a short run in May 1930. The New Yorker hosted more dance recitals before the opening of its next legitimate show, Electra, in December 1930. Oliver D. Bailey signed a five-year lease for the theater in January 1931. In general, the theater suffered from low attendance during the Great Depression. Among the theater's productions in 1931 were the plays Gray Shadow, Young Sinners, Ebb Tide, and It Never Rains; the musical Fast and Furious; and performances by the New Yorker Grand Opera Company. The next year, the theater hosted several plays performed by the Spanish-speaking theatrical company La Compania Dramatic Espanola, as well as another dance festival. The Bowery Savings Bank bought the New Yorker and the adjacent office building for $650,000 in December 1932.

The bank leased the theater to Continental Music Halls Inc. for five years in September 1933. Continental announced plans to convert the theater into a nightclub called Casino de Paree (sometimes spelled Casino de Paris), with dining areas on two stories and a kitchen in the basement. The club's operators spent $200,000 on renovations, reopening the venue on December 12, 1933. It was one of three theaters near 54th Street that were converted to nightclubs in the mid-1930s. There were 1,150 seats on two levels. The stage was used as a dance floor, accessed by steps from the orchestra level, and was flanked by two bands. Billy Rose organized two shows a night, for which guests paid $1.50 to $2 per ticket. According to Variety, the nightclub "just about satisfies the gastronomic, bibulous, and entertainment needs of any mortal".

The club's operators bought the theater and adjacent office building in March 1934. The club's cheap revues competed with Broadway musicals with higher-priced tickets. Rose withdrew from the venture in September 1934 because of disagreements over pay. The Casino de Paree was closed for renovations in February 1935, reopening two weeks later. The Casino de Paree abruptly closed after filing for bankruptcy in April 1935. That December, the Bowery Savings Bank leased the theater to the Palladium Operating Corporation, which planned to convert it into an "English"-style music hall. The Palladium Music Hall opened the next month; it was to host a new show every two weeks, with two bands performing during dinnertime. The Palladium had trouble paying wages within three weeks of its opening, and it closed permanently at the beginning of February 1936.

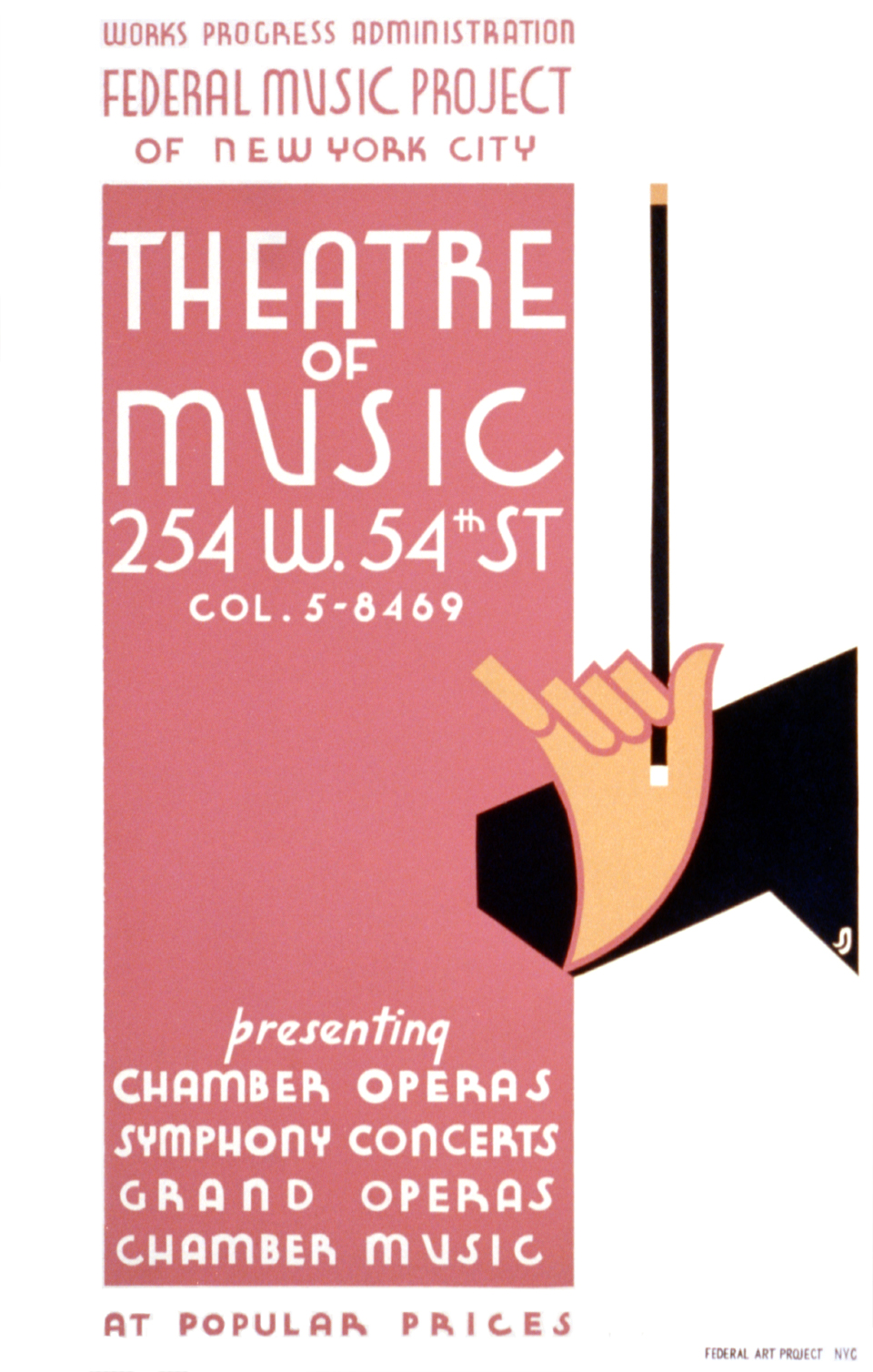
WPA Theatre of Music

The Works Progress Administration (WPA)'s Federal Music Project leased the theater, as well as four of the office floors, in November 1936; the venue would host operas and concerts by the WPA's Theatre of Music. The WPA renovated the theater over the next two months, opening the Theater of Music on January 24, 1937. The WPA renewed its lease later the same year. An all-black WPA cast from Chicago presented The Swing Mikado at the New Yorker Theatre in early 1939; after two months, the production moved to the 44th Street Theatre. The play Medicine Show then premiered at the New Yorker in April 1940, closing after a month. This was the theater's last Broadway show for nearly six decades.

== Broadcast studio ==
The Bowery Savings Bank again owned the New Yorker Theatre by late 1940, and the bank's real-estate agent Joseph O'Gara was looking to lease the venue. That October, RCA Manufacturing signed a one-year lease for the theater, exhibiting television projectors there. RCA subsidiary NBC installed a 9-by-12-foot (2.7 by 3.7 m) television screen by the end of 1940. Early the following year, NBC installed a 15-by-20-foot (4.6 by 6.1 m) projection screen on the stage, spending $25,000 to $30,000 on the project. The first public exhibition of the theater's screen was in May 1941, when over a thousand audience members watched a live broadcast of a boxing match between Billy Soose and Ken Overlin at Madison Square Garden. In September 1941, the Top Dollar Theatre company unsuccessfully tried to lease the venue from the Bowery Savings Bank. The New Yorker Theatre then briefly hosted the children's play The Adventures of Marco Polo at the end of that December.

=== CBS Studio 52 ===
The Columbia Broadcasting System (CBS) leased the New Yorker Theatre in August 1942 for use as a radio soundstage. The theater operated as a radio and television studio for three decades, known as Radio Playhouse No. 4 or Theater No. 4., then converted for television in 1949, becoming CBS-TV Studio 52. (Note: In a 1997 book by Anthony Haden-Guest, the studio's associate director Ed Gifford said that the theater was known as "Studio 53". However, this claim is not corroborated by any other source.) Shielded television cameras had to be developed due to strong magnetic interference from equipment at a neighboring power substation for the New York City Subway system. The studio was one of seven that CBS operated in New York City. At that time, several Broadway theaters had been converted to TV studios due to a lack of studio space in the city.

Likely the first television show to be produced at Studio 52 was The 54th Street Revue, which premiered in May 1949. Another early show produced at Studio 52 was The Fred Waring Show in 1950. Studio 52 and the neighboring Studio 50 (now the Ed Sullivan Theater) were among CBS's busiest stages by the early 1960s. The theater hosted such shows as What's My Line?, The $64,000 Question, Video Village, Password, To Tell the Truth, Beat the Clock, The Jack Benny Show, I've Got a Secret, Ted Mack and the Original Amateur Hour, and Captain Kangaroo. Studio 52 was used to tape many of the CBS shows that involved panel discussions. Members of the public could also buy tickets to view these tapings. The New York Times said in 1965 that many of the regular audience members were older women. The soap opera Love of Life was produced at Studio 52 until 1975 and was the last show to be taped there. CBS moved most of its broadcast operations out of Studio 52 in 1976 and placed the theater up for sale.

== Nightclub era ==
=== Inception and opening ===
By 1976, German-born male model Uva Harden was planning to open a nightclub in New York City, which he tentatively called "Studio". Harden and Israeli entrepreneur Yoram Polany agreed to take over the old CBS Studio 52 that year. Polany and another friend of Harden's independently recommended that the nightclub be called "Studio 54" because it was on 54th Street. Harden and Polany formed a corporation to operate the nightclub, but they struggled to obtain a liquor license from the New York State Liquor Authority (NYSLA). They hired Carmen D'Alessio, who had hosted monthly parties at Maurice Brahms's Infinity nightclub, as the club's publicist. To finance the nightclub, the operators of the Marlborough Gallery bought nearly all of the stock in Harden and Polany's corporation in November 1976. At the time, the gallery's owner Frank Lloyd had just been ordered to pay $9 million to artist Mark Rothko's estate in the Rothko case.

After continued delays, Harden met with entrepreneurs Steve Rubell and Ian Schrager, who agreed to partner with him in the nightclub's operation. Harden was eventually forced out of the club's operation, while Polany left on his own volition. In November 1976, Billboard magazine reported that Schrager and Rubell planned to convert the theater into a nightclub called Studio 54. It would be one of several discotheques to operate in Midtown Manhattan during the late 1970s. Rubell and Schrager formed the Broadway Catering Corp., which spent $400,000 to transform the theater into a nightclub. Rubell, Schrager, and Jack Dushey each owned a one-third stake in the venture, and they had hired several people to create the club by early 1977. These included architect Scott Bromley, interior designer Ron Doud, lighting designer Brian Thompson, and set designer Richie Williamson. Lighting designers Jules Fisher and Paul Marantz were hired to design the dance floor and rigging system. Rubell and Schrager retained D'Alessio to promote Studio 54.

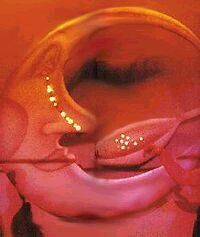
The Moon Man swung across the dance floor at Studio 54

The renovation involved the construction of a dance floor, a balcony, and a disco booth, as well as the addition of mirrors, light bars, and floating vinyl platforms. The orchestra seated 250 people, and the balcony had another 500 seats. The lighting system, which required three people to operate, included a dozen 16-foot-high (4.9 m) poles with flashing lights. Fisher and Marantz adapted the existing rigging system to generate special effects such as confetti, snow, fog, and weather. On the ceiling was a 30-by-40-foot (9.1 by 12.2 m) cyclorama, which could project images of many different galaxies. Other decorations included depictions of volcanos, sunrises, and sunsets. Aero Graphics designed a backlit moon and spoon, which became an icon of the Studio 54 nightclub. The club's promoters mailed out 8,000 invitations and made phone calls to numerous figures on "a good social list". Studio 54 officially opened on April 26, 1977, with workers rushing to finish the decorations just hours before the grand opening. Although the space could fit 2,500 guests, four thousand people attended the club on opening day. Hundreds of prospective patrons lined up around the block to enter, and several celebrities could not get in, despite having been invited.

=== The scene ===
Studio 54 had been launched as the disco dancing and music trend was gaining popularity in the U.S. Its popularity grew rapidly, especially after the publication of a widely-circulated picture that showed actress Bianca Jagger at the club, riding a white horse. In the month after its opening, the club served an average of 2,000 guests per night, open Tuesdays through Saturdays. By August 1977, the club had become so successful that Rubell and Schrager were considering opening similar nightclubs in Los Angeles and London. Rubell ultimately chose not to open similar clubs around the world, saying: "I'm very cautious about protecting the name and not cheapening it." In November 1977, Dan Dorfman of New York magazine quoted Rubell as saying that "only the Mafia made more money" than Studio 54, which made $7 million in its first year.

Upon Studio 54's first anniversary in April 1978, which attracted 3,000 guests, Rubell said the club's popularity contradicted sentiments that the club "wouldn't last more than a couple of months". That October, Rubell and Schrager closed the club for nine days, spending $500,000 on renovations. The work included adding spotlights and mirrored walls, as well as a movable bridge.

==== Admission policy ====
To be admitted to Studio 54 was a status symbol, even on nights when the club was open to the public. When Studio 54 opened, admission generally cost $7 or $8, but guests could pay for an annual membership in exchange for discounted tickets. Tickets were more expensive on weekends, and all ticket prices were increased on nights with performances. Rubell made the final decisions over whether guests were allowed in the club. Celebrities usually were allowed to enter immediately. According to a 1977 Wall Street Journal article, "very beautiful" members of the public were almost always admitted, while men entering alone were invariably rejected to prevent predatory behavior. Guests were divided into four categories, ranging from the "No Goods" (who could never be admitted) to the "No Fuck-ups" (important clients who were admitted instantly). Rubell bragged about the club's exclusivity, saying in a November 1977 interview with New York magazine: "I turned away 1,400 people last Saturday."

The club's doormen could be extremely selective, sometimes to the point that "they propelled themselves into a comedy universe" according to Haden-Guest. Rubell once told a "ravishingly beautiful woman" that she could enter for free if she took off all her clothes; the woman was later hospitalized for frostbitten nipples. The selective admissions policies led some guests to bypass the front door in an attempt to enter. According to Haden-Guest, one potential guest got stuck in a ventilation shaft and died, an account that Schrager later confirmed. Some of Studio 54's spurned clientele fled to other clubs such as New York, New York. When the club was renovated in 1978, Rubell and Schrager sealed its courtyard to prevent people from entering there. There was also a private entrance on 53rd Street, reflecting the "stratification" of the nightclub.

On several occasions, would-be guests attacked the doormen after being denied admission, and several guests pulled out guns when they were rejected. The club's security guards often cleared out trash cans within a several-block radius because of high concerns over violence. Some notables were denied admission. For instance, the president of Cyprus was once rejected because the doormen thought he was the president of New York City's Cypress Hills Cemetery. When one of Saudi king Khalid's sons was rejected, the Saudi embassy to the United States wrote Rubell a letter, asking that Khalid's son not be rejected again. The band Chic wrote a song in 1978, "Le Freak", after being refused entry to the club on New Year's Eve 1977, despite having been invited by Grace Jones. Even club members were not guaranteed entry. In June 1978, the New York City Department of Consumer Affairs (DCA) mandated that Rubell and Schrager stop selling memberships and refund existing members. The club failed to refund all memberships immediately, and Schrager claimed that November that only 40 members had applied for refunds.

==== Inside the club ====
The club generally opened at 10 p.m., with crowds peaking at midnight; the bar closed at 4 a.m., and the rest of the club stayed open until 6 a.m. According to Rubell, the vast majority of the club's guests were not celebrities but, rather, members of the public who just wanted to dance. The Washington Post wrote in November 1977 that the club attracted "a mix of punks, hairdressers, socialites, and suburbanites", while The New York Times said the club was "tolerant of errant squares". Andy Warhol, a regular guest of Studio 54, said the club was "a dictatorship on the door but a democracy on the dance floor". Studio 54 enforced a photography ban to protect guests' privacy, but some images were still published, including a widely circulated image of Margaret Trudeau, the wife of the Canadian Prime Minister, without her underwear.

Many guests used club drugs, and they often engaged in open sexual activity on the club's balcony and in private basement rooms. The Journal characterized most of the women guests as "beneficiaries of a fabulously lucky genetic selection" and that the men guests generally had an "aura of self-esteem born in the knowledge that one can successfully choose among the select". Celebrity appearances, which were almost guaranteed, were frequently showcased in New York City's daily newspapers and in gossip columns. The nightclub was also frequented by many gay celebrities, leading Anthony Haden-Guest to write that the club became "one of the single most effective showcases for newly visible gay clout". By 1978, there was a private dance floor behind a movable scrim on the main dance floor, as well as a VIP room in the basement, which could only be accessed by a hidden stairway.

The club also hosted private parties that, at a minimum, cost tens of thousands of dollars. The invitations to the parties were extravagant, using such materials as "Cupid's arrows, inflatable hearts, [or] jars of confetti". Among the events at Studio 54 was a New Year's Eve party hosted by event planner Robert Isabell, who dumped four tons of glitter onto the floor, creating a four-inch layer that could be found in attendees' clothing and homes several months later. The organizers of a Valentine's Day party in 1979 imported 3,000 Dutch tulips, transported 4,000 square yards (3,300 m^{2}) of sod from Bermuda, and rented eight antique sculptures that each cost $17,000. Other events at the club included fundraisers for local politicians, as well as a Halloween party hosted by the staff of People magazine. Studio 54 was also a filming location for several music videos, such as those for several songs in Musique's album Keep On Jumpin'.

===== Notable patrons =====
- Bella Abzug
- Woody Allen
- Mikhail Baryshnikov
- John Belushi
- Leonard Bernstein
- Jacqueline Bisset
- David Bowie
- Truman Capote
- Gia Carangi
- Allan Carr
- Cher
- Pat Cleveland
- Roy Cohn
- Salvador Dalí
- Divine
- Faye Dunaway
- Doris Duke
- Farrah Fawcett
- Ric Flair
- Betty Ford
- Tom Ford
- Diane von Fürstenberg
- Richard Gallo
- David Geffen
- Martha Graham
- Richard Gere
- Jerry Hall
- Halston
- Victor Hugo
- Anjelica Huston
- Debbie Harry
- Margaux Hemingway
- Tommy Hilfiger
- Lauren Hutton
- Sterling St. Jacques
- Michael Jackson
- Bianca Jagger
- Mick Jagger
- Rick James
- Bruce Jenner (Note: Bruce Jenner was later known as Caitlyn Jenner after publicly coming out as a trans woman in 2015. When she visited Studio 54, she had not come out yet.)
- Elton John
- Grace Jones
- Tom Jones
- Jacqueline Kennedy Onassis
- Eartha Kitt
- Calvin Klein
- Karl Lagerfeld
- Timothy Leary
- Fran Lebowitz
- John Lennon
- Lorna Luft
- Bette Midler
- Liza Minnelli
- Freddie Mercury
- Jack Nicholson
- Al Pacino
- Dolly Parton
- Paloma Picasso
- Richard Pryor
- Gilda Radner
- Lou Reed
- Geraldo Rivera
- Rollerena Fairy Godmother
- Diana Ross
- Brooke Shields
- Frank Sinatra
- Sylvester Stallone
- Paul Stanley
- Percy Sutton
- Tallulah
- Elizabeth Taylor
- John Travolta
- Margaret Trudeau
- Donald and Ivana Trump
- Tina Turner
- Valentino
- Diana Vreeland
- Andy Warhol
- Robin Williams

===== Other notables =====
- Actor Al Corley was a doorman during the late 1970s.
- Actor Alec Baldwin worked for two months as a waiter at Studio 54.
- Sally Lippman, also known as "Disco Sally", was a 77-year-old widow and regular dancer at the club.
- Carolina Somoza, daughter of Nicaraguan president Anastasio Somoza Debayle, frequented the club.

=== Downfall ===
==== License issues and other disputes ====
Schrager did not have a liquor license when the club opened, despite having applied to the NYSLA for such a license. Instead, the nightclub applied for a "caterers' permit" every day; these permits were intended for weddings or political events, but they technically allowed the venue to serve alcohol. The club also did not have a certificate of occupancy or a public assembly license, prompting tipsters to complain to several federal agencies. On May 21, 1977, the NYSLA raided the nightclub for selling liquor without a license. The club reopened the next night, serving fruit juice and soda instead of liquor. Studio 54 continued serving non-alcoholic drinks exclusively until a justice for the New York Supreme Court, the state's trial-level court, ordered the NYSLA to grant Studio 54 a liquor license that October. The NYSLA's chairman complied with the Supreme Court ruling but objected to it, claiming that the judge had been influenced by Studio 54's upscale clientele. The New York Court of Appeals upheld the Supreme Court's decision in June 1978.

Schrager also applied for a cabaret license from the DCA, which did not grant Studio 54 a permanent cabaret license for more than a year. A contributing factor was that the city government only employed three cabaret inspectors, who could not validate all of the city's cabaret licenses in a timely manner. Additionally, the DCA rarely fined unlicensed cabarets more than $25. At the beginning of June 1978, DCA officials said the cabaret application had not been approved because of multiple violations of fire codes, though the New York City Fire Department refused to provide further details about these violations. The DCA could also deny a permanent license because of unresolved consumer complaints, such as those concerning Studio 54's annual memberships. The DCA refused to renew Studio 54's temporary cabaret license in August 1978 because Schrager and Rubell had not refunded all of the memberships.

Also in August 1978, the American Society of Composers, Authors and Publishers (ASCAP) sued Rubell and Schrager, alleging that the co-owners had failed to pay licensing fees for six performances that ASCAP had staged at Studio 54 earlier that year. Studio 54 ultimately paid ASCAP for a license in November 1978. The National Labor Relations Board was also investigating the club by February 1979 after some workers alleged that the club had engaged in unfair labor practices.

==== End of the first era ====
In December 1978, a tipster called the Internal Revenue Service (IRS), alleging that Rubell and Schrager were skimming profits. The tip came from a disgruntled ex-employee, who also alleged that cocaine was illegally being stored in the basement. Shortly after, IRS agents raided Studio 54 and arrested Rubell and Schrager. The club continued to operate the night of the raid. A federal grand jury indicted Rubell and Schrager on charges of tax evasion in June 1979, observing that the two men had skimmed $2.5 million, or as much as 60 percent of Studio 54's receipts over the past two years. In an unsuccessful attempt to lessen the charges against the club's co-owners, Schrager's lawyer Mitchell Rogovin alleged that Hamilton Jordan, chief of staff to U.S. president Jimmy Carter, had used cocaine in the club's basement. In anticipation of increasing interest in rock music, Rubell and Schrager spent $1.2 million to renovate Studio 54 in late 1979. They installed a grand chandelier and a fly system above the stage, as well as removing seats from the balcony.

Rubell and Schrager ultimately pleaded guilty to tax evasion in November 1979, after New York magazine published a cover story describing the "party favors" that the two men gave to their friends. In exchange, federal prosecutors agreed not to charge the men with obstruction of justice and conspiracy. By then, the club was in danger of losing its liquor license after the owners had pleaded guilty to tax evasion, as the NYSLA did not give liquor licenses to convicted felons. Rubell and Schrager were each sentenced to three and a half years in prison in January 1980. The two men attended a final party on the night of February 2–3, 1980, with Diana Ross and Liza Minnelli singing for numerous guests. Rubell and Schrager began serving their sentences two days afterward. Ultimately, Rubell and Schrager were paroled after a year, and Schrager received a Presidential Pardon decades later. (Note: Schrager received a presidential pardon from Barack Obama in 2017, but Rubell died in 1989.)

The NYSLA unanimously voted not to renew Studio 54's liquor license on February 28, 1980, citing Rubell's and Schrager's criminal convictions, although the club was allowed to continue operating. The club lost its liquor license on February 29, and the club started serving fruit punch the next day. Studio 54's lawyers also announced that they would create a board of directors to operate the club. The third co-owner, Jack Dushey, had received a $10,000 fine and had been sentenced to five years of unsupervised probation after being convicted of conspiracy charges in March 1980. By the end of that month, Rubell was considering selling the club, despite having promised just two months prior that he would never sell Studio 54. Among those who expressed interest in the club were restaurateur Mark Fleischman, television host Dick Clark, and record executive Neil Bogart. The club closed down at the end of that March, as the revocation of the liquor license had caused a sharp decrease in business. Early the next month, Fleischman agreed to buy an option that would allow him to purchase the club for $5 million.

=== Fleischman and Weiss operation ===
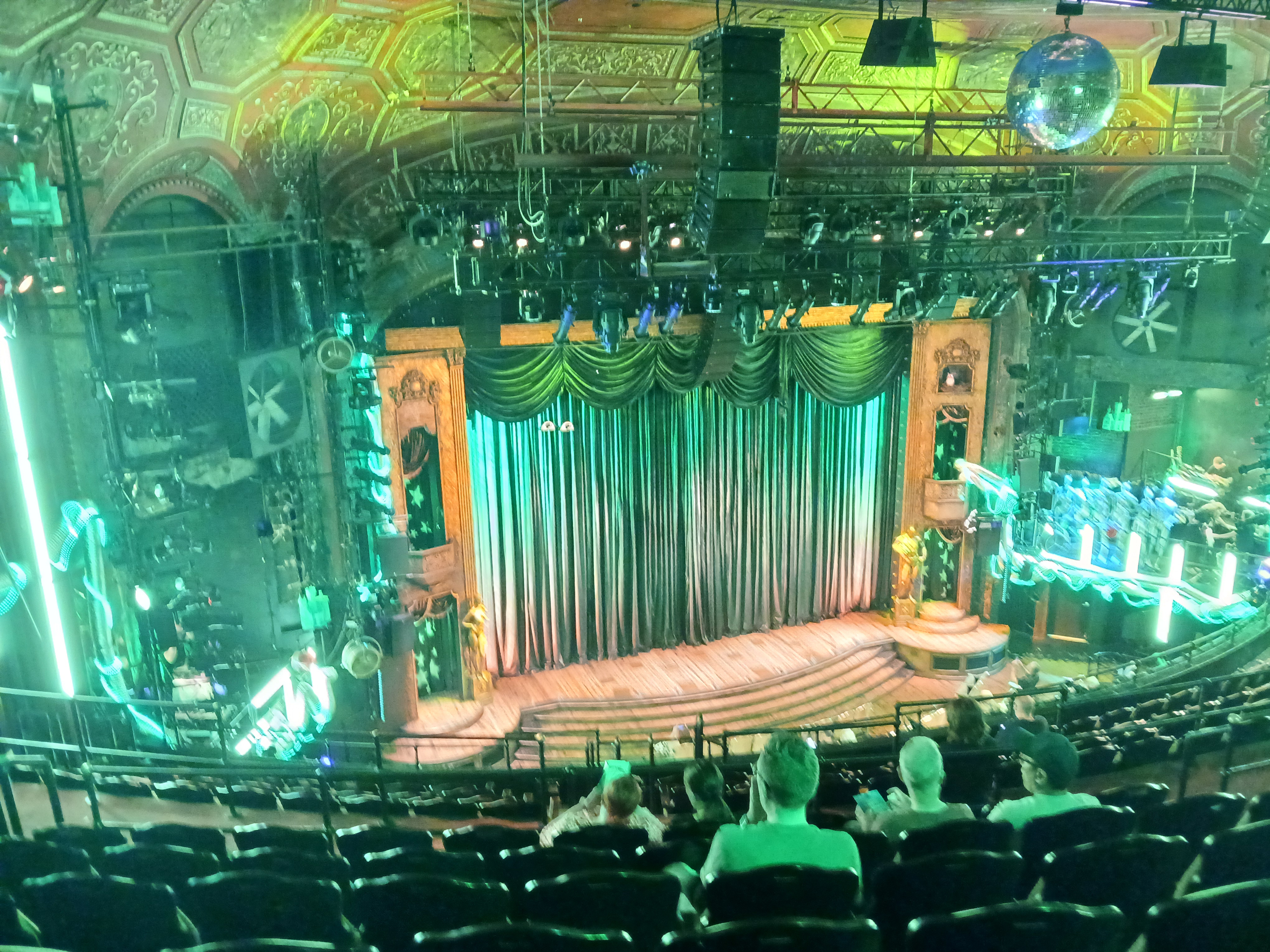
Studio 54's stage as seen from its balcony

Mark Fleischman announced his plan to take over Studio 54, seeking to host live shows there and obtain a liquor license from the NYSLA. Studio 54 remained shuttered through the rest of the year, in large part because Rubell and Schrager continued to file legal objections against the NYSLA's revocation of the club's liquor license. The authority would not issue a liquor license as long as the club was involved in active litigation. Mike Stone Productions leased the club from Rubell and Schrager in early 1981, and the club started hosting private events again, albeit without alcoholic drinks and only on Friday and Saturday nights. Rubell's company sold the building to Philip Pilevsky for $1.15 million in cash in August 1981, leasing back space from Pilevsky. Fleischman applied for a liquor license from the NYSLA, which agreed to grant the license on the condition that Rubell and Schrager not be involved in any way. Fleischman also repainted the interior and removed the original club's light fixtures, and he paid the New York state government $250,000 in back taxes.

Studio 54 officially reopened to the public on September 15, 1981. Fleischman and his partner Jeffrey London mailed out 12,000 invitations for Studio 54's reopening, which were delivered on 25-watt silver lightbulbs. Jim Fouratt and Rudolf Piper were hired as Studio 54's new managers. Initially, the club hosted "Modern Classix nights" during Wednesdays and Sundays, while it hosted disco music for the remainder of the week. There was also a 32-track recording studio in the basement, which was used for recording promotional videos and rock concerts. Notable figures associated with the second iteration of Studio 54 included doorman Haoui Montaug, as well as Paul Heyman, who was a photographer, producer, and promoter at the club. A notable guest during this time was Drew Barrymore, who was nine years old when her mother took her to Studio 54. Within three months of the club's reopening, Fleischman had ousted Fouratt and Piper, who opened the Danceteria nightclub.

In 1982, social activist Jerry Rubin started hosting "Business Networking Salons", a networking event for businesspeople, at the club on Wednesday nights. Prospective guests would only be admitted if they had a business card; the networking events quickly became popular, often attracting 1,500 guests. For other events, Studio 54 implemented an invitation system, which enabled its operators to restrict some events to select guests without turning them away at the door. The club's mailing list had 200,000 names by 1984. Frank Cashman acquired the $3 million lien on the club in late 1984. The same year, Studio 54 also hosted special musical performances, starting with a series of concerts by Julie Budd. Meanwhile, the club was gradually losing long-time regulars to competing discotheques, including the Palladium, which Rubell and Schrager had opened after being released from prison. The club also faced several lawsuits from disgruntled high-profile guests, such as football player Mark Gastineau and a basketball player.

Fleischman filed for bankruptcy in November 1985; he had planned to spend $250,000 on renovations to attract guests. The club closed in April 1986 because it could not obtain liability insurance, in part because Studio 54 was losing so many of the lawsuits in which it was involved. Subsequently, Shalom Weiss took over Studio 54. The nightclub tended to attract a young and racially mixed clientele who were frequently involved in fights, prompting complaints from local residents. City officials revoked the club's cabaret license for two years in January 1989 after finding that the club's patrons frequently used cocaine illegally. The officials alleged that Studio 54 employees not only encouraged illegal drug use but also used cocaine themselves. In addition, the club admitted guests as young as 13 and had falsely advertised itself as selling alcoholic beverages.

=== The Ritz and Cabaret Royale ===
Studio 54 was dilapidated by the late 1980s; the walls had peeling paint, while the auditorium's dome had been concealed by a dropped ceiling. Neil Cohen and John Scher, owners of the Ritz nightclub, leased the space from Philip Pilevsky for 25 years in 1989. They spent $2 million to restore the theater, adding fixed seating at orchestra level and installing production equipment above the stage. Cohen and Scher anticipated that the club could fit 3,000 people, including standees, although the theater only had about 1,800 seats. The Ritz relocated from the East Village to Studio 54 on April 5, 1989. According to The New York Times, the new Ritz was more popular than the old location because both the orchestra and balcony had "excellent sound and sightlines". The Ritz was primarily a rock club, but it also hosted performances of pop music and salsa music. The Ritz was one of the most active nightclubs in the United States, with about 150 shows annually, until its promoters started booking fewer shows in mid-1991. Despite declining profits in 1992, the club's owners were planning to add a 250-seat side room next to the auditorium.

CAT Entertainment acquired Scher's interest in the Ritz in December 1992, and CAT was itself acquired by Cabaret Royale Corporation the next year. In July 1993, the Ritz announced it would close down and reopen as a topless bar. CAT Entertainment spent $3 million renovating the theater, including the stage area. CAT also resurrected both the nightclub and the Studio 54 trademark, which had never been properly registered by any of the prior owners or operators. John Neilson took over the venue with plans to reopen it as an uptown location of the Stringfellows nightclub. The remodeled nightclub opened in January 1994 and was operated as "Cabaret Royale at Studio 54". Most of the old theater's architectural detail had been covered up by then.

Meanwhile, the Bank of Tokyo had previously granted a mortgage on the theater and the adjacent office building to Pilevsky, which it foreclosed upon in June 1994. Later that month, the theater and building were auctioned off. CBS, the Manhattan Theatre Club, and Viacom were among those that showed interest in acquiring the theater and building. Allied Partners, run by the Hadar family, ultimately acquired the properties for $5.5 million. Allied then renovated the office building. Cabaret Royale closed in January 1995, and Allied announced plans to convert the space into a virtual reality gaming venue at a cost of $10 million. In anticipation of Studio 54's conversion, the nightclub hosted a final party on May 23, 1996, featuring disco star Gloria Gaynor and performers such as Crystal Waters and RuPaul. The virtual-reality complex was never built because of a lack of demand, and the club's space was instead rented out for private events. Allied Partners preferred that the Studio 54 building become "anything but a nightclub".

== Roundabout Theatre at Studio 54 ==
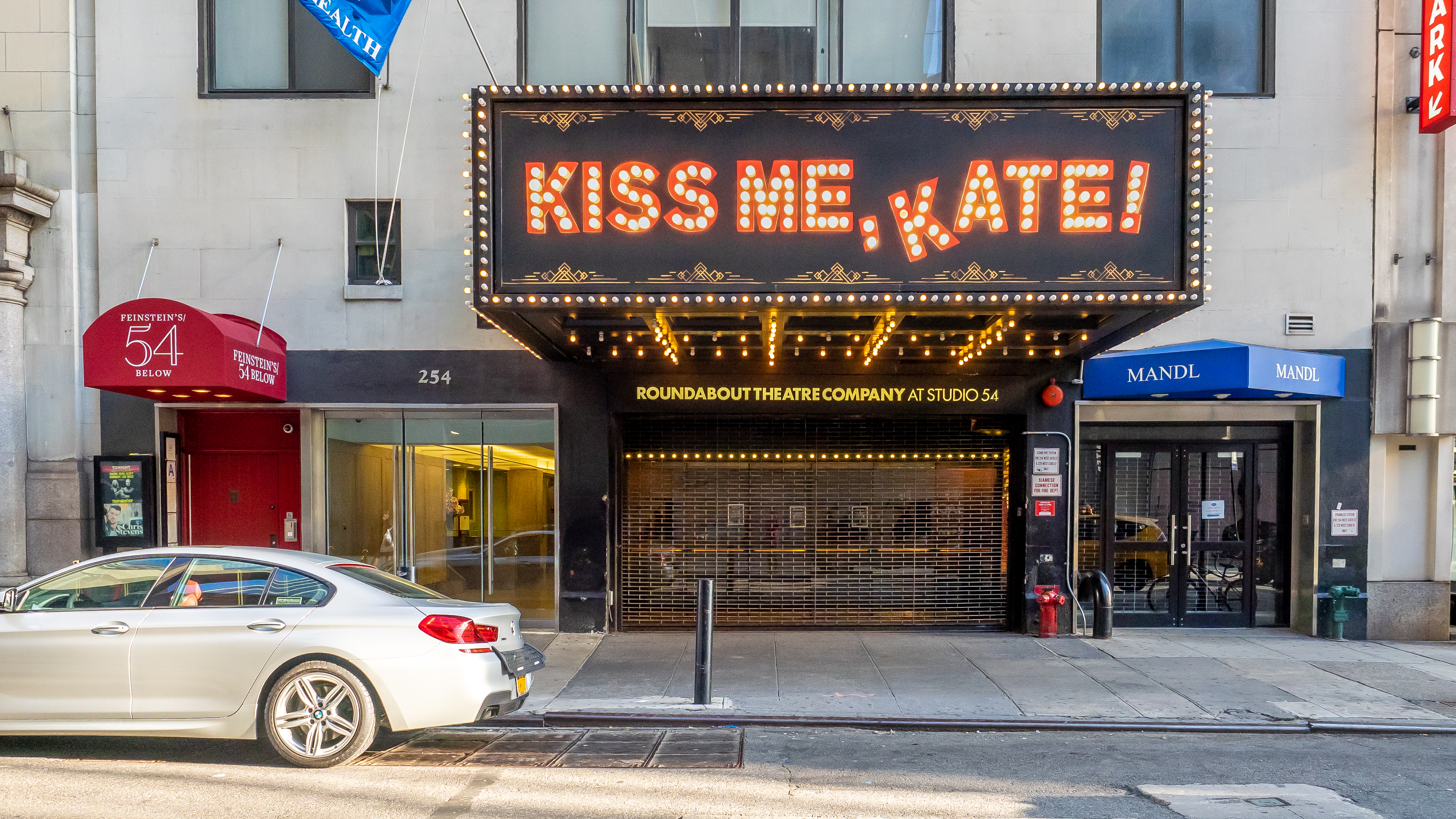
Studio 54's exterior

Since 1998, the nonprofit Roundabout Theatre Company has operated Studio 54 as a Broadway theater, branded as Roundabout Theatre at Studio 54. It is one of Roundabout's three Broadway theaters, alongside the Todd Haimes Theatre and the Stephen Sondheim Theatre.

=== Relocation and early productions ===
In July 1998, the collapse of a construction hoist at 4 Times Square blocked access to the Henry Miller Theatre (now Stephen Sondheim Theatre) on 43rd Street, where the nonprofit Roundabout Theatre Company's successful revival of the Broadway musical Cabaret was playing. Roundabout quickly began searching for alternative venues and, in September 1998, decided to move the production to Studio 54. The old nightclub required extensive renovations and was not air-conditioned, but Roundabout's artistic director Todd Haimes considered it the "only viable option" for the theatre company. Cabaret's producer Sam Mendes had considered Studio 54's dilapidated condition to be an ideal setting for the production, just as the Henry Miller had been. Roundabout spent over $1 million converting the former nightclub into a 950-seat theater, (Note: The New York Times cites a figure of $1.7 million, while American Theatre magazine describes the renovations as having cost $1.5 million.) buying old seats from the Imperial Theatre and installing them in the mezzanine. Cabaret moved to Studio 54 in November 1998, doubling the production's capacity.

Richard Hadar announced in early 1999 that he would operate a nightclub within the theater, which would still host performances of Cabaret during the day. By 2001, Roundabout was negotiating to buy Studio 54 from the Hadar family, which would allow the theatre company to own a Broadway theater for the first time. Early the next year, the Hadar family agreed to sell the theater for around $25 million. To fund the purchase, Roundabout would receive up to $32 million in tax-exempt bonds and $9 million from the New York City Department of Cultural Affairs (DCA). Roundabout finalized its purchase in July 2003, paying $22.5 million, of which $6.75 million came from the DCA and $17.7 million came from tax-exempt bonds. Allied continued to own the office space above the theater.

=== 2000s and 2010s ===
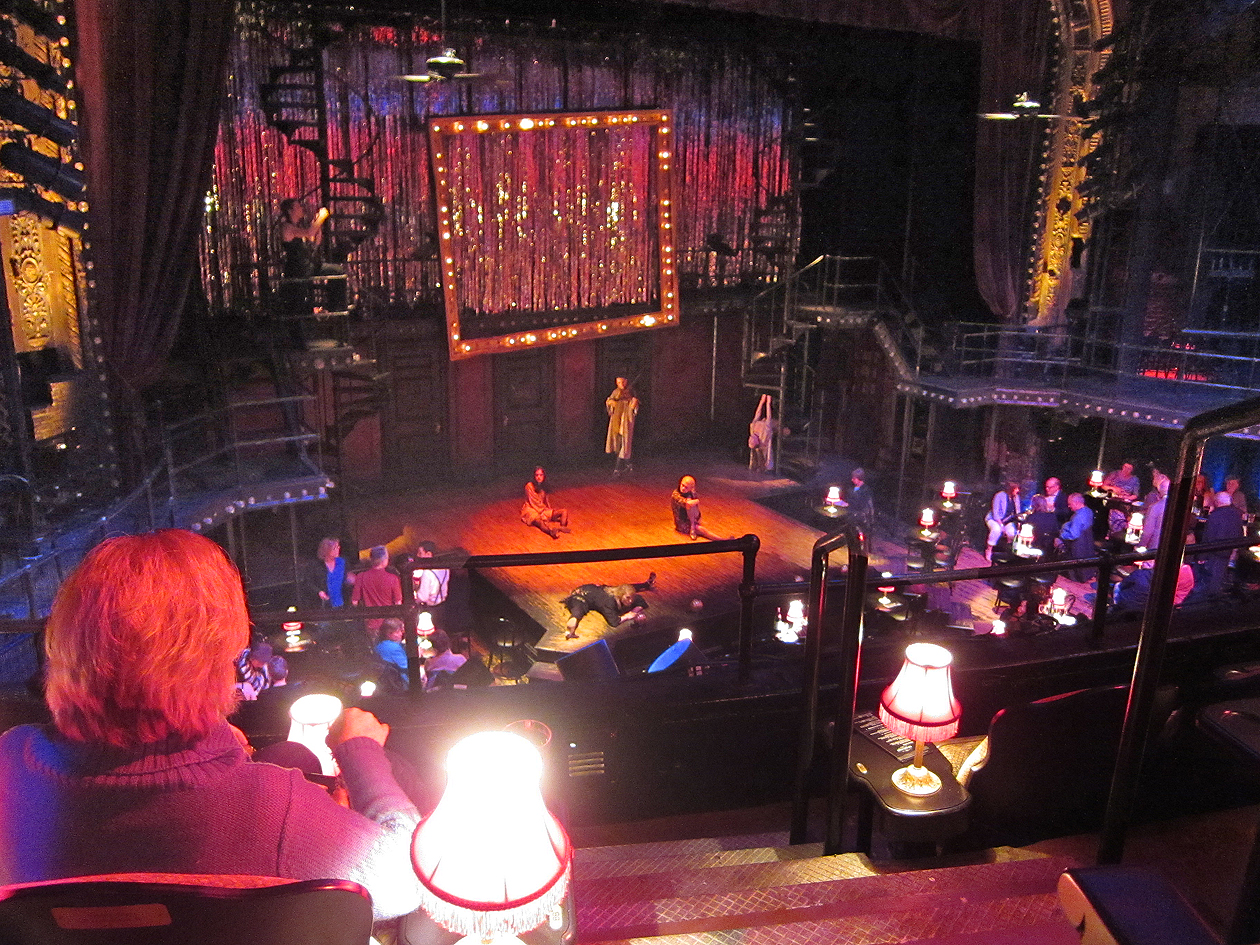
Studio 54's balcony, seen in 2014

Roundabout planned to use Studio 54 to host larger productions that could not be staged at the American Airlines Theatre. Haimes also wanted to renovate the theater, including expanding the orchestra pit and replacing the rigging system. After Cabaret closed in January 2004, Roundabout staged several shows a year at both theaters, and Studio 54 hosted a mixture of musicals and plays. The Stephen Sondheim and John Weidman musical Assassins was Roundabout's first new production at Studio 54, opening in April 2004. A revival of another musical by the same team, Pacific Overtures, opened that December. Following these two productions, Broadway historian Louis Botto wrote that Studio 54 "had finally fully been welcomed into the Broadway family nearly 80 years after Fortune Gallo first dreamed of it".

Roundabout completed some renovations in 2005, which involved installing raked seating and an exhibit in the promenade. The theater hosted a revival of Tennessee Williams's A Streetcar Named Desire in April 2005. For the 2005–2006 season, Studio 54 staged Eugene O'Neill's A Touch of the Poet and Bertolt Brecht's The Threepenny Opera. The theater then hosted the plays The Apple Tree and 110 in the Shade in the 2006–2007 season; The Ritz and Sunday in the Park with George in the 2007–2008 season; and Pal Joey and Waiting for Godot in the 2008–2009 season. For the 2009–2010 season, the theater presented Carrie Fisher's solo performance Wishful Drinking, as well as and James Lapine and Stephen Sondheim's revue Sondheim on Sondheim.

During the 2010–2011 season, Studio 54 hosted Brief Encounter (an adaptation of two Noël Coward works), as well as the musical The People in the Picture. Studio 54 was supposed to host a revival of Bob Fosse's musical Dancin' during the 2011–2012 season, but this was ultimately canceled, and the theater was instead closed for renovations. The theater's next production was the play Harvey, which opened in June 2012. This was followed in November by The Mystery of Edwin Drood, the theater's only production for the 2012–2013 season. Roundabout booked a revival of Cabaret for the 2013–2014 season, although the theater remained dark for a year. Cabaret opened in April 2014, initially for a 24-week engagement, but the show was so popular that it ran for a year. The play An Act of God opened at Studio 54 in May 2015, being the theater's only production during the 2014–2015 season.

The theater then returned to presenting two productions per season. Studio 54 hosted the play Thérèse Raquin and a revival of the musical She Loves Me during the 2015–2016 season, followed by the musical Holiday Inn and the play Sweat during the 2016–2017 season. Next, the theater hosted John Leguizamo's solo show Latin History for Morons and an American Sign Language revival of Children of a Lesser God in 2017–2018. The theater staged The Lifespan of a Fact and Kiss Me, Kate for the 2018–2019 season. Studio 54 hosted Adam Rapp's play The Sound Inside, which opened in October 2019.

=== 2020s to present ===
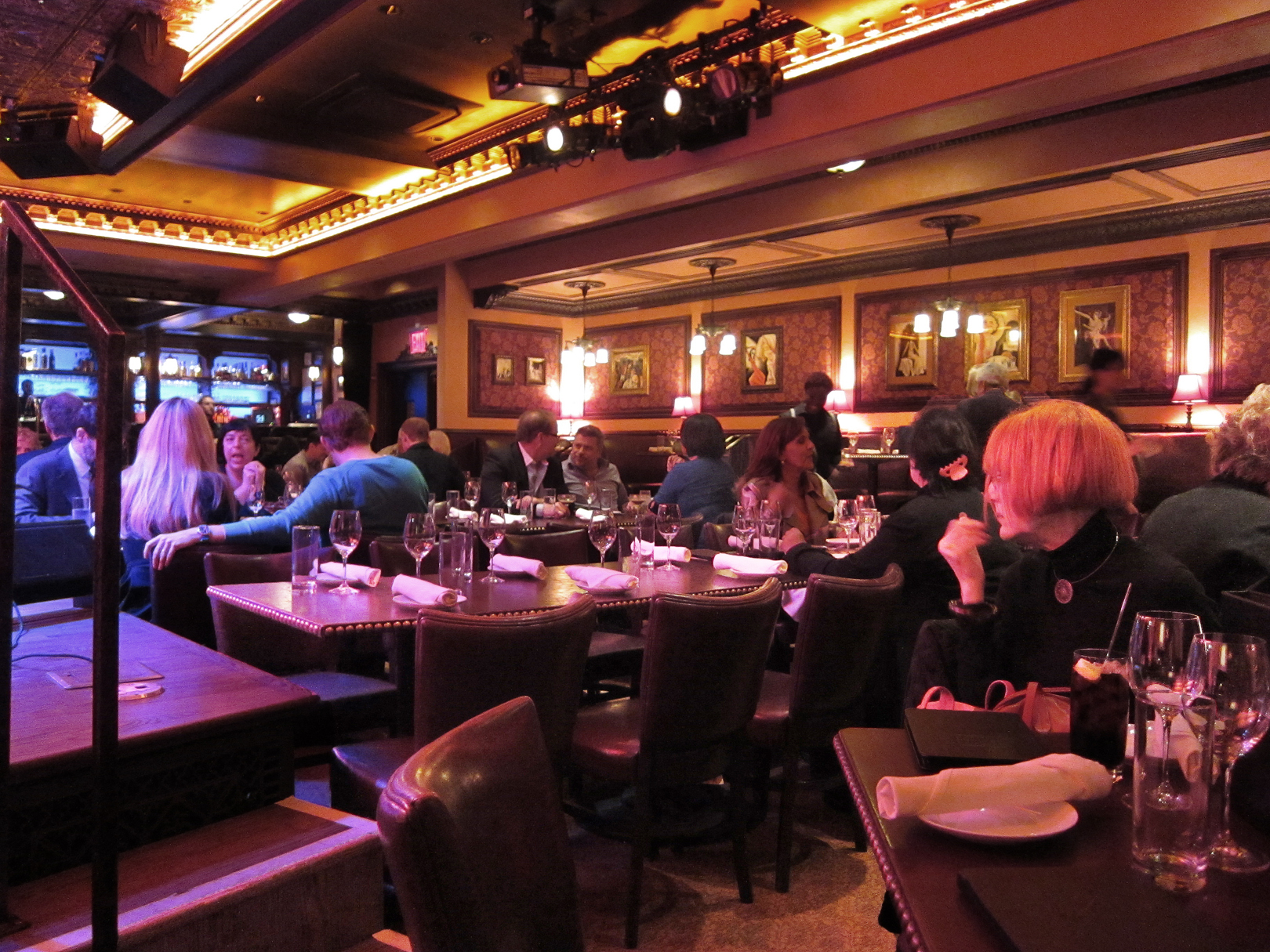
54 Below dining area

Studio 54 was supposed to host the musical Caroline, or Change during the 2019–2020 season. Due to the COVID-19 pandemic, Studio 54 closed on March 12, 2020, a day before previews of Caroline, or Change were supposed to start. That show's opening had originally been delayed to early 2021, but it was pushed further due to the extension of COVID-19 restrictions. Studio 54 reopened on October 8, 2021, with previews of Caroline, or Change, which officially opened later that month. This was followed from April to July 2022 by the Tracy Letts play The Minutes, then by the Sharr White play Pictures from Home from February to April 2023. The musical Days of Wine and Roses opened at Studio 54 in January 2024, running for three months. It was followed in November 2024 by the musical A Wonderful World, then in June 2025 by Jean Smart's one-woman show Call Me Izzy. For the 2025–2026 season, Studio 54 hosted the play Oedipus, then the musical The Rocky Horror Show.

Meanwhile, some of the design modifications for the old nightclub had never been reversed when Studio 54 was converted to a theater, creating poor sightlines and reducing the theater's potential profits; a temporary stage had to be installed every time a new show was staged. In late 2025, Roundabout requested a zoning permit from the New York City Department of City Planning to allow renovations. By April 2026, Roundabout had raised $45 million of the renovation's proposed $100 million cost, and it was seeking funding from the city and state governments, as well as permission to sell the theater building's air rights. The next month, Roundabout started a campaign to raise $120 million for the theater. The Department of City Planning approved the zoning permit that June. The project was to include renovating the orchestra seating, adding back-of-house spaces and an elevator, rebuilding bathrooms, and adding accessible seating. That August, the office of Manhattan borough president Brad Hoylman-Sigal recommended approval of Roundabout's zoning permit.

== Notable productions ==
Productions are listed by the year of their first performance.

=== Gallo Opera House/New Yorker Theatre ===
Notable productions at the theater
Opening year	Name	Refs.
1927	Thirteen operas presented by the San Carlo Company	(Note: La bohème, Rigoletto, Madama Butterfly, Faust, La traviata, Aida, Martha, La Tosca, La forza del destino, Carmen, Cavalleria rusticana, The Barber of Seville, Il Trovatore)
1927	Electra	
1927	Juno and the Paycock	
1928	A Tailor-Made Man	
1930	Electra	
1931	Young Sinners	
1937	The Swing Mikado	

=== Studio 54 (Roundabout) ===
Notable productions at the theater
Opening year	Name	Refs.
1998	Cabaret	
2004	Assassins	
2004	Pacific Overtures	
2005	A Streetcar Named Desire	
2005	A Touch of the Poet	
2006	The Threepenny Opera	
2006	The Apple Tree	
2007	110 in the Shade	
2007	The Ritz	
2008	Sunday in the Park with George	
2008	Pal Joey	
2009	Waiting for Godot	
2009	Wishful Drinking	
2010	Sondheim on Sondheim	
2010	Brief Encounter	
2011	The People in the Picture	
2012	Harvey	
2012	The Mystery of Edwin Drood	
2014	Cabaret	
2015	An Act of God	
2015	Thérèse Raquin	
2016	She Loves Me	
2016	Holiday Inn	
2017	Sweat	
2017	Latin History for Morons	
2018	Children of a Lesser God	
2018	The Lifespan of a Fact	
2019	Kiss Me, Kate	
2019	The Sound Inside	
2021	Caroline, or Change	
2022	The Minutes	
2023	Pictures from Home	
2024	Days of Wine and Roses	
2024	A Wonderful World	
2025	Call Me Izzy	
2025	Oedipus	
2026	The Rocky Horror Show	

== Legacy ==
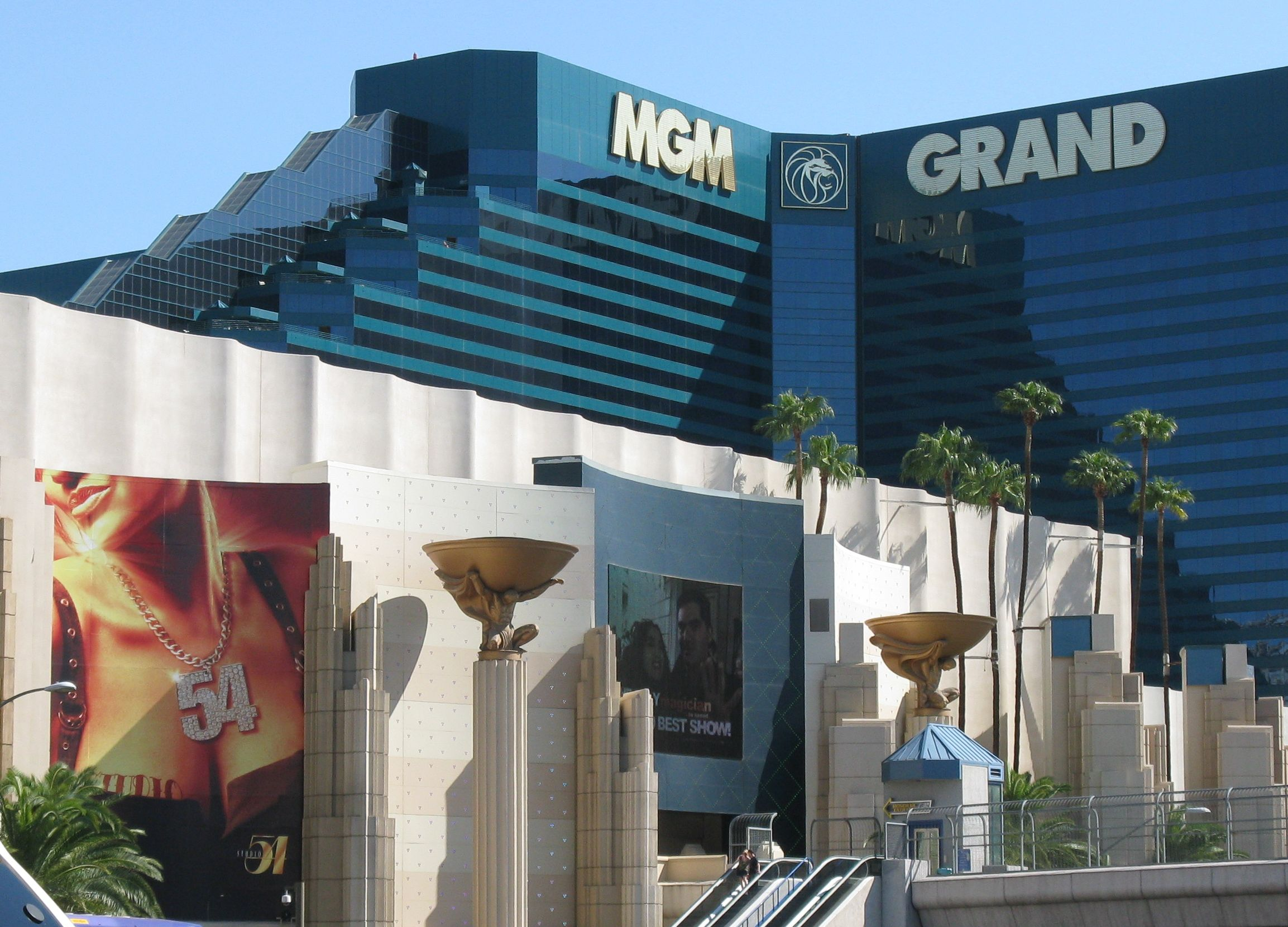
Studio 54 at MGM Grand in Las Vegas

By the late 1970s, the original nightclub had spurred the creation of Studio 54-themed jeans, a record label, an album, and a Japanese club. Architectural Digest magazine described Studio 54 as "the nightclub where the velvet rope was born", its impact evident long after the venue had been converted back to a theater. GQ magazine wrote in 2020: "When you want to designate a particular brand of louche elegance on a night-time scene, Studio 54 is the natural first port of comparative call."

=== Cultural impact ===
==== Media ====
The nightclub has been the subject of several works of popular media. The original Studio 54 was featured in the 1998 drama film 54. Studio 54, a 98-minute documentary by Matt Tyrnauer released in 2018, includes unpublished footage of the club and interviews with Ian Schrager. Studio 54 also appears as a setting in other movies, including the 1999 film Summer of Sam and the 1996 film I Shot Andy Warhol. Several books have also been written about the nightclub. The writer Anthony Haden-Guest published a book about Studio 54 and the disco subculture in 1997, and Mark Fleischman published his memoir Inside Studio 54 in October 2017. Schrager also published a book in 2018, Studio 54, with images of the club. In 2024, Robert Greenblatt and Neil Meron began producing Studio 54 the Musical, a Broadway musical about the club.

Studio 54 has also had an influence on disco music. The 1979 song Fashion Pack by Amanda Lear from her third album Never Trust a Pretty Face makes references to Studio 54. Casablanca Records released a compilation album of disco music, A Night at Studio 54, in 1979; it peaked at No. 21 on the Billboard 200 album chart and sold close to a million copies. In 2011, Sirius XM launched Studio 54 Radio, a satellite radio station featuring classic disco and dance tracks from the 1970s to the 2000s. In 2020, it expanded into a music imprint including a record label, Studio 54 Music, which works with Sirius XM on Studio 54 Radio. The label's first release, Night Magic Vol. 1, is a four-track compilation EP of disco anthems from the club's prime days, revised by musicians from both the original scene and the modern dance music era. Studio 54 also inspired the name and overall concept of singer-songwriter Dua Lipa's 2020 concert series Studio 2054.

==== Exhibitions and similar clubs ====
The club has been featured in several exhibitions. These include an exhibit of Studio 54 photographs, which Haden-Guest presented at the WhiteBox art gallery in 2015. as well as a Brooklyn Museum exhibition titled Night Magic, which premiered in 2020. In addition, multiple Studio 54-themed collections from fashion and cosmetics brands, including Calvin Klein, Michael Kors and NARS Cosmetics, were released in 2019. The collections took inspiration from the club's glamorous heyday and showcased the iconic "54" logo.

Several venues have been likened to Studio 54. Fiorucci, an Italian fashion shop formerly located on East 59th Street, became known in the late 1970s as the "daytime Studio 54". The Mutiny Hotel in Miami, Florida, was described in a PBS NewsHour interview as "kind of the closest thing to Miami's Studio 54" in the late 1970s. The nightclub also inspired the creation of a Studio 54-themed nightclub at the MGM Grand Las Vegas hotel and casino in 1997; that club operated until 2012. Another Miami venue often compared to Studio 54 is LIV at the Fontainebleau Miami Beach, which coincidentally uses the same letters as the Roman numeral for "54".

=== Memorabilia and preservation ===
Before Rubell died in 1989, he saved "every single item" that he collected from the nightclub, such as the reservation book, invitation cards, and drink tickets. More than 400 of these items were sold at an auction in West Palm Beach, Florida, in January 2013, attracting hundreds of buyers. The auction yielded $316,680; the most expensive item was a $52,800 Andy Warhol sculpture.

The New York City Landmarks Preservation Commission (LPC) had started considering protecting Studio 54 as a landmark in 1982, with discussions continuing over the next several years. The LPC commenced a wide-ranging effort to grant landmark status to Broadway theaters in 1987, and the commission considered designating Studio 54's interior as a landmark. Ultimately, although the LPC protected 28 Broadway theaters as landmarks, Studio 54 was not one of them.

== See also ==
- List of Broadway theaters
