= Joculator flindersi =

Scientific classification
- Kingdom: Animalia
- Phylum: Mollusca
- Class: Gastropoda
- Subclass: Caenogastropoda
- Order: incertae sedis
- Family: Cerithiopsidae
- Genus: Joculator
- Species: J. flindersi

Binomial name
- Joculator flindersi Cotton, 1951

Species of gastropod

Joculator flindersi is a species of small sea snails, marine gastropod molluscs in the family Cerithiopsidae. It was described by Cotton in 1951.
