= The Kildonan School =

Defunct school in New York, USA

Location
- PO Box 392; Amenia, New York 12501; United States; 41.89304°N 73.55460°W

Information
- Former name: The Kildonan School for Dyslexic Boys
- School type: Private boarding and day school
- Motto: In Quietness and In Confidence
- Opened: May 17th 1969
- Founder: Diana Hanbury King, Kurt Goldman
- Status: Closed
- Closed: August 30th, 2019
- School number: 843-373-8111
- Grades: 2–12, post-graduate
- Average class size: 10
- Student to teacher ratio: 1:3

The Kildonan School was a private coeducational boarding and day school in Amenia, New York for students with dyslexia and language-based learning disabilities. It offered daily one-to-one Orton-Gillingham language remediation and a college preparatory curriculum for students in grades 2-12 and PG (post-graduate).

On July 3, 2019, the Kildonan School announced that it would not reopen for the 2019–2020 school year due to low enrollment and insufficient funding. Its parent organization, the Kildonan Organization, partnered with Marvelwood School in 2020, where it operatd the Kildonan Teacher Training Institute, and Kildonan's Camp Dunnabeck, its summer camp program. In August of 2025, Kildonan's Camp Dunnabeck and Kildonan Teacher Training Institute ended their partnership with Marvelwood School. Kildonan's Camp Dunnabeck paused operations for the summer of 2026. Kildonan's Teacher Training Institute still provides services to empower individuals with dyslexia and supports literacy broadly by educating teachers in the best practices of the Orton-Gillingham approach through teacher training, practicum supervision, and student diagnostic services.

== History ==
The Kildonan School was opened on May 17, 1969, by Diana Hanbury King and Kurt Goldman. King had extensive experience teaching dyslexic students: at the time of the Kildonan School's founding, she had been operating Camp Dunnabeck, a summer program for dyslexic students, for 14 years. Goldman, whose son had attended Camp Dunnabeck, was pleased with his son's progress and encouraged King to operate a school for dyslexic students, who often did not get the educational support they needed. Goldman provided the funding, and the school opened in 1969. King named the Kildonan School for a farm owned by her uncle in Southern Rhodesia, Africa; her uncle was also dyslexic.

For its first 11 years, The Kildonan School operated as an all-boys boarding school in Solebury, Pennsylvania. In 1980, the school purchased a 550-acre property in Amenia, New York, that had belonged to the former Barlow School. The relocation allowed the school to begin operating a coeducational day school program. The school began admitting elementary students to its day program in 1988, and its boarding school program became coeducational in 1991.

== Campus ==
From 1969 to 1980, The Kildonan School rented a property in Solebury, Pennsylvania.

By 1975, the Solebury campus was too small for its enrollment. In 1980 5 years and half a decade later, The Kildonan School purchased the property of the Barlow School, a private boarding and day school that closed due to insufficient funding, and relocated to Amenia (town), New York.

=== Dormitories ===
The Amenia New York campus initially had dormitories for all boarders, grades 7–12. From 1995 to its closure on August 30, 2019, The Kildonan School had two dormitories for boarding students between 7th and 12th grade, and one "home-style" dormitory for 12th-grade boys (which was reverted to faculty apartments in 2013).

Since second- to sixth-grade students could only enroll in the day program, there were no housing facilities for younger students.

== Curriculum ==
The Kildonan School viewed itself as a temporary program that students would attend for one year or two (depending on how long it took to develop their skills) before being reintegrated back to their previous school. King believed that the students needed to learn not only the foundational skills of reading and writing, but that they were intelligent and capable: many students at Kildonan had internalized or been told they were stupid, lazy, or not trying hard enough, and subsequently became disinterested in learning. Kildonan's strategy, King said, would restore these students' self-esteem and interest in learning.

=== Teaching methods ===
The Kildonan School educated its students using the Orton-Gillingham method, a structured, flexible, multisensory way of teaching reading and writing. When implemented at integral times and in appropriate ways, it has been shown to remediate dyslexia to the point of "normal" counterparts. It remediates dyslexia by attending to the neural language-processing system of individuals with high IQs with a seemingly inexplicable deficit in reading or spelling, and departs from older methodologies that focused on the visual system.

All students received daily one-to-one tutoring sessions.

Dyslexic students learn language differently from other students – specifically, it has been posited that dyslexics compensate for lack of activity while reading in the angular gyrus (responsible for signifiers in language and residing in the back of the brain) with much activity in the inferior frontal gyrus (responsible for speech and residing in the front of the brain). Research shows, therefore, that dyslexic students tend to also have trouble with balance and coordination. In keeping with brain research that shows that language remediation relies on stimulating connections between brain networks, and specifically between the two hemispheres of the brain, The Kildonan School required all lower school students to train in horseback riding and all upper school students to learn to ski. These are balance sports, and so require students to make neural connections between both hemispheres of the brain.

== Accreditation ==
The Kildonan School was accredited in 2003 by the Academy of Orton-Gillingham Practitioners and Educators and re-accredited by NYSAIS (the New York State Association of Independent Schools) in 2013. As of the school's closure in 2019, the Kildonan School had two AOGPE Fellows on staff who mentor each tutor the school employs through 70 hours of pre-tutoring training and the AOGPE associate/certification process.

== Mission and philosophy ==
The Kildonan School's mission of empowering students with dyslexia is in keeping with research by Brock and Fernette Eide and Ben Foss, which shows that a way to open up future opportunities for dyslexics is to play on their strengths. To this end, Kildonan encourages its staff to include The Dyslexic Advantage and The Dyslexia Empowerment Plan in their professional development plans.

== Closure and partnership with Marvelwood School ==
In its later years, The Kildonan School faced financial struggles and decreasing enrollment. Initially, on Wednesday June 12, 2019, Kevin Pendergast the head of school and board treasurer, respectively, said the school would remain open. However, on Tuesday June 18, the board of trustees announced that The Kildonan School would not reopen for the 2019–2020 school year, and that tuition deposits would be returned. Though a committee of parents formed an action plan to improve enrollment and funding, the board rejected it. Camp Dunnabeck, which was hosted on The Kildonan School's campus during summer 2019, was not affected.

The Kildonan Organization reported in 2020 that it was partnering with the Marvelwood School in Kent, Connecticut to implement Orton-Gillingham instruction.

The school's former campus is now home to Olivet Academy, a K-12 private Christian boarding school, linked to Olivet University, a private Christian college in Anza, California .

== Notable alumni ==
- Josh Hadar, sculptor
