= Volvarina occidua =

Scientific classification
- Kingdom: Animalia
- Phylum: Mollusca
- Class: Gastropoda
- Subclass: Caenogastropoda
- Order: Neogastropoda
- Family: Marginellidae
- Subfamily: Marginellinae
- Genus: Volvarina
- Species: V. occidua

Binomial name
- Volvarina occidua (Cotton, 1944)

Synonyms
- Marginella occidua Cotton, 1944 (original combination)

Species of gastropod

Volvarina occidua, is a species of sea snail, a marine gastropod mollusk in the family Marginellidae, the margin snails.

== Description ==
The length of the shell attains 12 mm.

== Distribution ==
This marine species is endemic to Australia and occurs off Western Australia.
