= Alvania occidua =

Scientific classification
- Kingdom: Animalia
- Phylum: Mollusca
- Class: Gastropoda
- Subclass: Caenogastropoda
- Order: Littorinimorpha
- Superfamily: Rissooidea
- Family: Rissoidae
- Genus: Alvania
- Species: A. occidua

Binomial name
- Alvania occidua (Cotton, 1944)

Synonyms
- Alvania (Alvania) occidua (Cotton, 1944); Alvania (Linemera) occidua (Cotton, 1944) · alternate representation; Linemera occidua Cotton, 1944 ·

Species of gastropod

Alvania occidua is a species of small sea snail, a marine gastropod mollusk or micromollusk in the family Rissoidae.

== Description ==
The length of the shell attains 2.1 mm, its diameter 1 mm.

== Distribution ==
This species is endemic to Australia and occurs off South Australia and Western Australia
