= Leopold Square =

Mixed-use development in Sheffield, England

Coordinates: 53°22′54″N 1°28′19″W

Leopold Square is a mixed-use development in Sheffield's West End, England, located at the corner of Leopold Street and West Street. The development, by Ask Developments and Gleeson's in collaboration with local architects AXIS Architecture, comprises the refurbishment of the former Central Technical School buildings, built between 1870 and 1894, into apartments, bars, restaurants and a hotel.

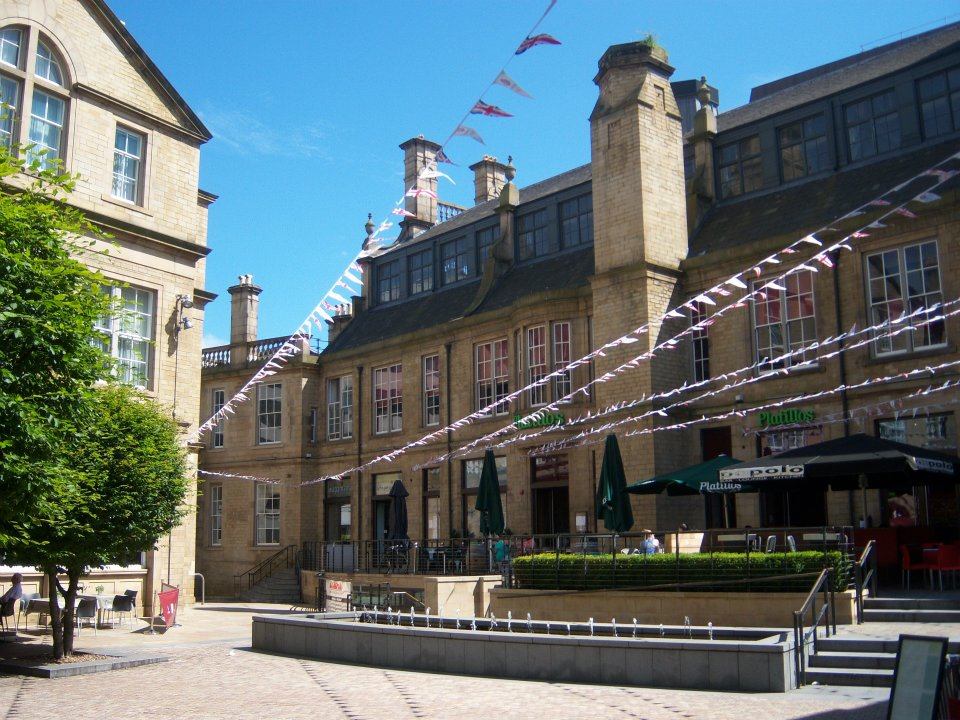
Leopold Square

Opened in 1995, City Hall tram stop on the South Yorkshire Supertram network is located at the northern side of Leopold Square. The development also has a new angular building to house a bar and a restaurant, and the creation of a brand new public square. The redevelopment of the old buildings began in 2004, following years of use as council offices after the closure of the Schools.

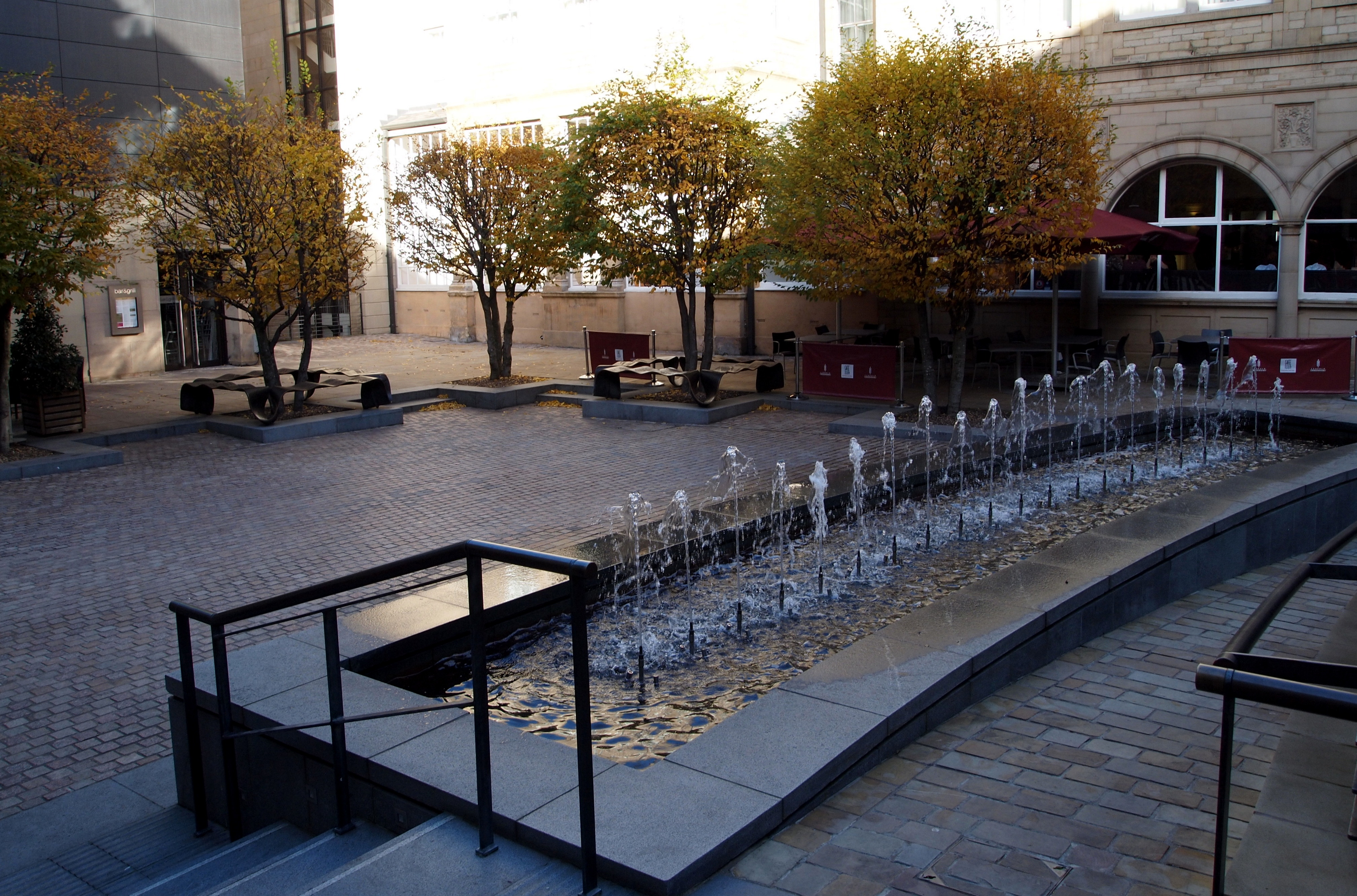
The water feature in Leopold square

Leopold Square is Sheffield's best new building, as voted for by people living and working in the city. At an awards ceremony held at the Showroom on 16 February 2011, the scheme won the People's Award as part of the Sheffield Design Awards 2010 - an event sponsored by Sheffield Civic Trust and RIBA Yorkshire every two years. 200 jobs were created through the project.

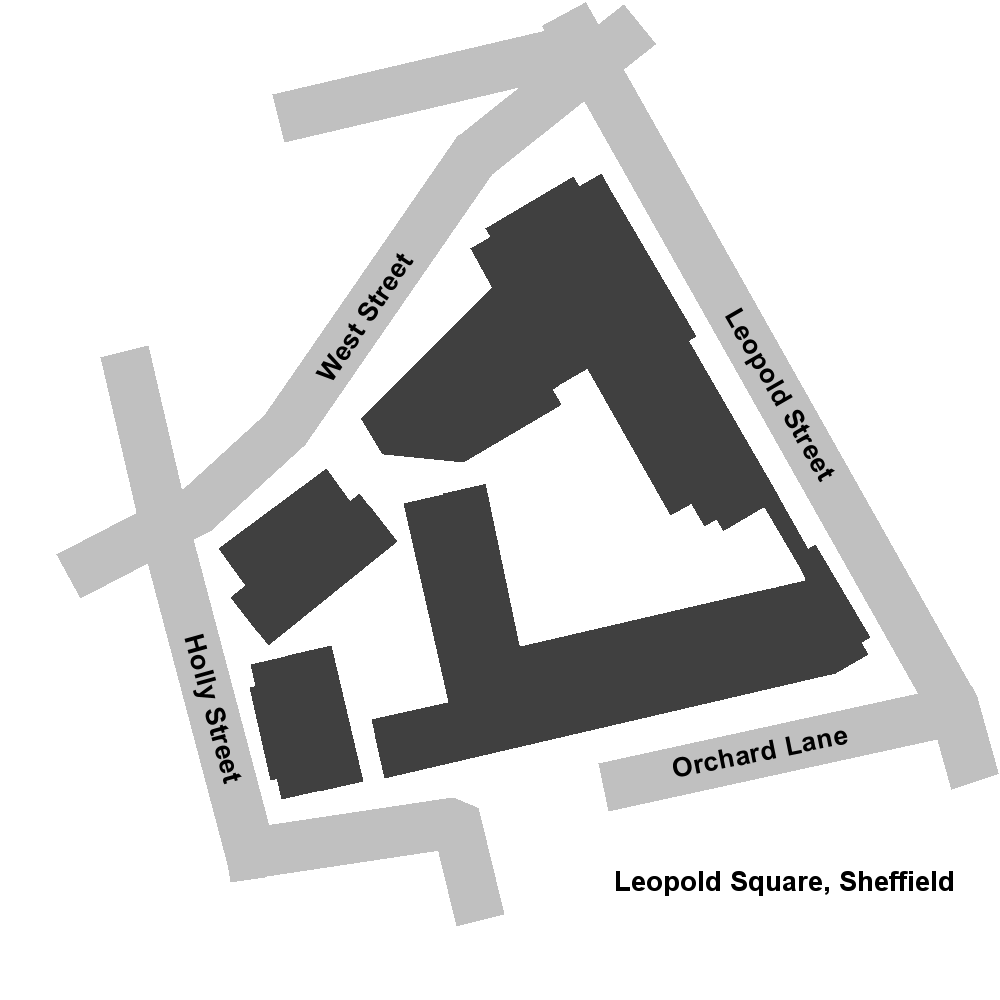
Plan of Leopold Square

Leopold Street is named for Prince Leopold, Duke of Albany, youngest son of Queen Victoria, who officially opened Firth College there in 1879.

== Public square ==
The public square is surrounded by the original Grade II listed buildings from the old technical school, which was home to Peter Stringfellow, and a dynamic new building fronting onto West Street. These buildings house eight individual bars, restaurants, a four star hotel and frequently plays host to live music. The square is marked with an illuminated water feature and a tree lined square. Benches specially designed for the square have been cast by an artist out of bronze and will provide resting places under the trees around the central square. The new angular building is built from locally sourced stone and genuine bronze cladding.

== Residential courtyard ==
To the west of the site the smaller former school buildings have been converted to residential use and the new apartments surround a private courtyard. The apartments are unusual and often occupy double height spaces and contain retained existing features. The entrance to the Holly Building on Holly Street is particularly noteworthy for it ornate timber vestibule.
