= King Mojo Club =

Nightclub in Sheffield, England

Coordinates: 53.40113933476782°N 1.4647326739830286°W

The King Mojo Club, often known as the Mojo, was a nightclub in Pitsmoor, Sheffield, South Yorkshire, England located at 555 Pitsmoor Road, that operated between 1964 and 1967.

Peter Stringfellow and his brothers had been running the Black Cat Club from St Aidan's church hall in the city, which proved a success. In March 1964, they opened a new venture, the King Mojo Club, in a converted house at 555 Pitsmoor Road to the north of the city centre. The house had recently served as Dey's School of Ballroom Dancing and benefited from a sprung dance floor. The club never received a drinks licence, but did have a coffee bar.

The club quickly became a venue of the Northern Soul scene, with popular American acts such as Wilson Pickett (backed by Reg Dwight's Bluesology), Stevie Wonder, Ike and Tina Turner, and Geno Washington playing. It also hosted Edwin Starr's first UK gig, and Don Covay and The Goodtimers.

Stringfellow experimented with a records-only night on Tuesdays, then an original concept. He advertised the list of records which he would play in advance in the local newspaper.

The club hosted up and coming live acts, including Pink Floyd and The Who. The Small Faces played their first gig outside London at the Mojo, and The Kinks worked out the arrangement of "All Day and All of the Night" while at the club.

The Mojo Club was also known for its art. Its walls were decorated by Dave Manvell and Paul Norton in a pop art style, Stringfellow himself painting African warriors dancing. Colin Duffield designed innovative posters for the club, later using his skills to produce a wide range of posters for other local venues.

In 1967, Stringfellow along with his brother Geoffrey decided to refocus the club on psychedelic music, renamed it the "Beautiful King Mojo", and redecorated it accordingly. they booked Jimi Hendrix, who played despite a complaint about drug use. The Mojo also received complaints about noise, and its licence was revoked later in the year. It was converted into a bingo club and was demolished in the 1980s. As a stopgap before their new club "The Penthouse" opened, Pete and Geoff ran Mojo nights in the basement ballroom at the City Hall. This was a much bigger venue than the old club with a proper stage. Pete played records and introduced live acts including Johnny Johnson and the Bandwagon and Martha and The Vandellas. The Monday club night after Otis Redding's death in December 1967 he played Redding's songs virtually all evening.
