= Rollerena Fairy Godmother =

Gay American roller-skater, entertainer, activist

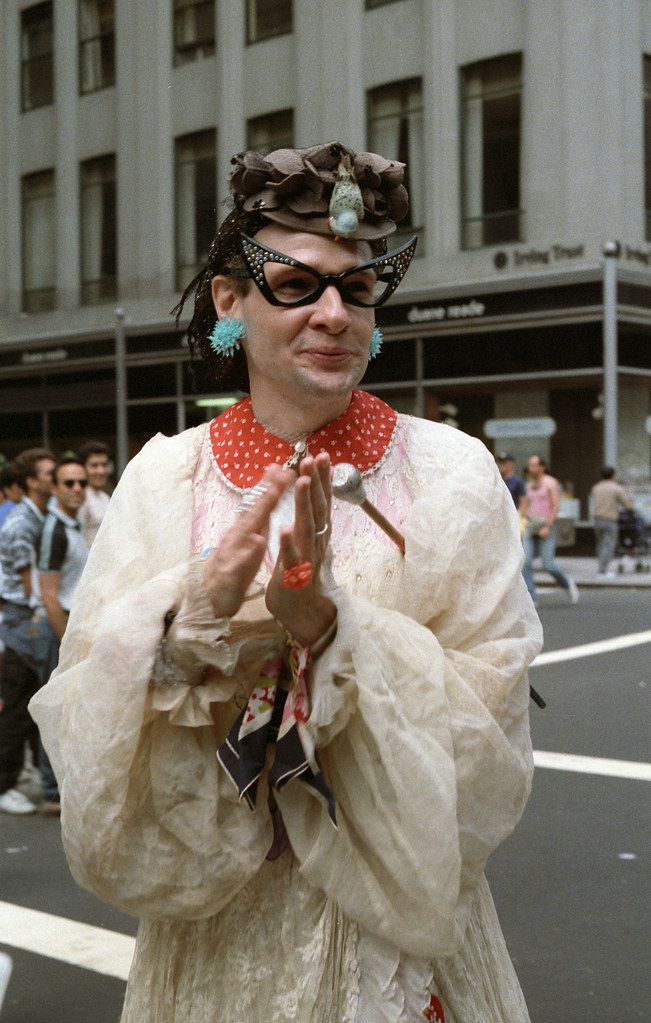
Rollerena, an activist known for appearing on roller skates in a fairy godmother costume, at the New York City Pride March, June 30, 1985

Rollerena Fairy Godmother (often shortened to Rollerena) is a persona created by an American man and Vietnam War veteran who gained recognition in New York City during the 1970s and 1980s for roller-skating in costume through various neighborhoods. Known for appearing in a distinctive ensemble, Rollerena became associated with nightlife, disco culture, and public performance.

The character of Rollerena originated on September 16, 1972. According to accounts, a young man from Kentucky entered an antique shop called Opulent Era on Christopher Street in Greenwich Village and expressed interest in skating down the street wearing a glittered bathrobe. He was subsequently dressed in a 1930s-style ballgown, along with accessories such as a hat and basket, and began skating along the street. The appearance attracted onlookers, marking the public debut of the persona.

Over time, Rollerena developed a signature style that included rhinestone glasses, costume jewelry, a small horn, and a wand. She was known for wearing a button that read “How dare you presume I’m heterosexual” and for inviting admirers to kiss a ring she referred to as her "dingleberry ring". Rollerena frequented upscale neighborhoods, gay venues, and well-known nightlife destinations, including Studio 54.

Rollerena did not identify as a drag queen and instead used terms such as "that person", "Fairy Godmother", or cross-dresser to describe herself. Though widely recognized in public and media appearances, she prefers to keep her true identity anonymous.

== Early life ==
Rollerena was born in 1948 in a rural area outside Louisville, Kentucky. He was raised in a predominantly Southern Baptist environment but attended Catholic school. His mother worked as a nurse, and his father was employed in a factory. He realized he was queer at the age of 4, although he did not come out in his hometown, later traveling by bus or hitchhiking into Louisville to meet men. He was nicknamed “the belle of three counties” and has referred to himself as a third-generation hillbilly.

=== Vietnam ===
After graduating from high school, Rollerena served in the United States Army and was assigned to the 25th Infantry Division during the Vietnam War. Initially attempting to evade the draft by relocating and ignoring correspondence from the Selective Service, he held various jobs during this period, including working at a hot dog stand, a bookstore, a restaurant, and as an elevator operator. At the time of his third draft notice, he was living in New York City at a YMCA. He reported to the induction center expecting to fail the physical examination, but he was declared fit for service and subsequently drafted.

While stationed in Vietnam, his responsibilities included handling artillery rounds, preparing explosives, and assisting headquarters operations. During his deployment, he experienced significant weight loss and was hospitalized in Japan for rehabilitation before returning to Vietnam. He came back to the United States in September 1969 and experienced survivor's guilt. He has described his experience in Vietnam as confusing and frightening. In an interview published in Mandate magazine, he commented that he had been sent "to help protect Anita Bryant's front lawn from Communism", referencing the American singer and noted critic of gay rights.

== Rollin' Skeets ==
Before adopting the persona of Rollerena, he briefly performed under the name Rollin' Skeets. In late 1969, amid the threat of a transit strike in New York City, the company he worked for began organizing carpool arrangements, which he found overly complicated. Although the strike was ultimately avoided, subway fares increased from 20 cents to 30 cents in early 1970. On a particularly hot day, he decided to begin skating to work and officially started doing so on May 12, 1970, viewing roller skates as a practical solution to his commuting challenges.

He practiced skating techniques at night near 79th Street and Fifth Avenue on the Upper East Side. Skating became a form of emotional relief and contributed to the development of a new personal identity. Over time, he began incorporating accessories into his routine, such as a horn (after a collision with a cyclist), a backpack (to carry lunch more easily), a visor (to shield from insects and debris), and an umbrella hat purchased from a vendor in Central Park. These additions contributed to the creation of the Rollin' Skeets character.

He maintained the Rollin' Skeets persona for approximately two years, including attending his first pride parade in 1971 in character. In September 1972, Vogue referenced him as "a man in high-laced roller skates, yellow goggles, and a cap with a polka-dotted parasol on the top".

== Professional life ==
In 1974, he began working in New York City's financial district. He chose to keep his identity private to prevent colleagues from discovering his association with the Rollerena character. Although he has never publicly disclosed his specific occupation, media outlets have variously speculated that he may have worked as a stockbroker, executive, lawyer, salesman, or insurance industry employee.

In 1978, Rollerena was described as a blue-eyed man, approximately 5 feet 11 inches tall and weighing 128 pounds, who wore his long hair in braids in professional settings. He remained with the same company for nearly three decades before retiring in 2003.

== Rollerena persona ==
Before adopting the final version of her persona, Rollerena briefly used the name Roller-Arena. Although the character was conceived in September 1972, her public debut took place in late 1973 when she appeared at the Easter Parade near 49th Street and Fifth Avenue.

To preserve her anonymity, she would change into costume in discreet locations throughout New York City, leaving her residence in everyday attire and reemerging as Rollerena. She carried a large, brightly colored beaded bag that contained an antique wedding gown, one of approximately 30 hats from her collection, various pieces of jewelry, cat-eyed rhinestone glasses, and her roller skates.

Rollerena aimed to embody what she described as "the magnolia-petal purity in her chiffon fantasy, turn of the century ballgown". Her fashion has been described as evoking the style of upper-class suburban women of the late 1950s. She kept her nails long and reportedly washed her gown once per year. She did not smoke, drink alcohol, or wear makeup.

Her preferred skating locations included the Upper West Side, Midtown Manhattan, Greenwich Village, Fifth Avenue, Saks Fifth Avenue, the linen department at Bloomingdale's, and Studio 54. She also once skated through a Marine recruiting center in Lower Manhattan.

While skating, Rollerena often used a wand to "bless" people and objects. She became informally known as New York City's "fairy godmother", with a stated mission to spread what she called "Rollerena magic"—bringing joy, love, happiness, and unity.

She refers to Rollerena in the third person and describes the persona as a lifelong New Yorker. Although primarily based in New York, she occasionally attended out-of-town events for a fee if the engagement appealed to her.

== Cultural impact ==
Rollerena gained cultural visibility in New York City during the 1970s and 1980s, frequently referenced in local media and public commentary. In a 1977 New York Times column titled If I Were Mayor, Dick Cavett wrote, "I would encourage the development of more street eccentrics, the kind only New York seems to develop... The wonderful creature known as The Skating Pixie, who performs delightful arabesques while clad in taffeta gown and pillbox hat as he roller-skates through the city, would be subsidized". Anecdotes circulated of individuals feeling personally impacted by her presence; one man reported deciding to remain in New York City rather than return to Iowa after receiving a "blessing" from her.

She has been cited as a fashion icon and influence within the roller-skating community. Street skater Suzy Skates named Rollerena as one of her heroes, and she once served as maid of honor at a wedding. Author Edd Swift credited her as partial inspiration for his fictional character Miss Jessie in the novel Splendora. Images of Rollerena were also featured on commercially produced postcards.

Rollerena maintained a post office box and had business representatives. She appeared on various television and radio programs and appeared in numerous print publications.

Despite Rollerena's stated preference to avoid categorical labels, many publications described her using terms such as drag queen or transvestite.

=== "Rollerena" the Comic ===
In 1980, the New York Native began publishing a recurring comic strip titled Rollerena, which appeared in every issue. The strip garnered a positive reception. One reader described it as "a welcome relief to stumble upon a cartoon strip dealing with Rollerena". Another reader wrote in during a temporary hiatus when the cartoonist, Michael Thomas, was on vacation, requesting that the paper "bring back the guy in the gown", and commenting that "the paper just isn’t the same without the levity of Rollerena".

=== Lucia Valeska controversy ===
In December 1980, Lucia Valeska, then co-executive director of the National Gay Task Force, described Rollerena in a speech as a "traumatized homosexual" whose expressive performances stemmed from emotional disturbance. Rollerena responded with an open letter criticizing Valeska for making "defamatory and judgmental statements", accusing her of contributing to division within the LGBTQ+ community. This letter was distributed to media outlets across the country, and Valeska subsequently issued an apology.

== Roller skating and disco ==
Rollerena was a prominent figure in the roller-skating scene of the 1970s and 1980s. A 1980 New York Times article described her as "legendary in the city's roller skate subculture".

By the mid-1970s, Rollerena had become deeply involved in New York City's disco scene, particularly at Studio 54, where she regularly danced in roller skates. Despite her enthusiasm for skating, she expressed a preference for traditional, face-to-face dancing over the roller-disco format. She first visited Studio 54 on Halloween night in 1977.

During this period, Rollerena became well known in nightlife circles and was introduced to prominent figures including Liza Minnelli, Rudolf Nureyev, Steve Rubell, Roberta Flack, Betty Ford, Elizabeth Taylor, and Martha Graham.

Her skating increasingly shifted from public spaces to social events at Studio 54, where she regularly attended private charity benefits held on Monday nights. Following the club's temporary closure, she returned for its reopening in 1981, where she ceremonially "blessed" the event with her wand.

== Activism ==
=== AIDS advocacy and ACT UP ===
Rollerena became involved in HIV/AIDS activism in 1983, when she performed at a benefit for the AIDS Resource Center at the Five Oaks nightclub, singing Coal Miner’s Daughter. Around this time, she also began attending AIDS support groups in place of friends who were too ill to go themselves, though she stopped in 1984 as the emotional toll became overwhelming.

Following the death of a close friend in 1986, Rollerena became more deeply engaged in political organizing. In August 1987, she began attending ACT UP meetings. She officially joined the organization on October 19, 1987, and was given the title "Ticket Queen", selling tickets for ACT UP's demonstrations and events while skating through meeting spaces.

In 1988, she was among approximately fifteen ACT UP activists who protested a speech by then-President Ronald Reagan by holding placards denouncing his administration's inaction to the AIDS epidemic. The protest became violent when Reagan supporters physically attacked the demonstrators.

Rollerena was arrested during ACT UP's City Hall action in New York City on March 28, 1989, and again on April 20, 1989, in South Carolina while protesting legislation targeting people with HIV. In 1990, she joined over a thousand ACT UP activists who traveled to the New York State Assembly to advocate for increased AIDS funding. She also participated in demonstrations at Memorial Sloan Kettering Cancer Center, protesting the under-enrollment of patients in AIDS drug trials, and hosted a benefit dance party to support AIDS treatment efforts. She ended her involvement with ACT UP in March 1990.

=== Additional activism ===
In addition to her work on AIDS-related issues, Rollerena participated in a housing rally in Chelsea in 1986 to oppose an eviction. She took part in protests at St. Patrick's Cathedral targeting John Cardinal O’Connor over church positions on abortion, LGBTQ rights, and church-state separation. She also assisted elderly tenants and advocated in housing court on behalf of residents in her Upper East Side building. From 1971 to 1994, she attended every New York City Pride parade on roller skates.

== Honors ==
In 1988, Rollerena received a lifetime achievement award at the fourth annual Heritage of Pride awards ceremony. In her acceptance speech, she reflected on her move to New York City, stating, "I always knew that when I left my home state of Kentucky in 1967, New York City would always be the best place for me to serve as a role model for posterity".

She was also listed as an honorary guest at the drag ball Night of a Thousand Gowns and was honored at a gala benefit for ACT UP held on April 8, 1988.

== Alternate spellings ==
Alternate spellings for Rollerena include Roller Arena, Rollerina, Roller Rena, Roller-Arena, Rollerarena, and Roller(a)rena.

== Archival materials ==
Between 1995 and 2009, Rollerena donated a collection of personal materials to the Lesbian, Gay, Bisexual & Transgender Community Center Archives. The donation comprises four boxes containing newspaper and magazine articles, records of media appearances, documents related to her involvement with ACT UP, awards, correspondence, photographs, and her costume. Selected items from the collection have been digitized by the Digital Transgender Archive.
