= Peter Stringfellow =

British nightclub owner (1940–2018)

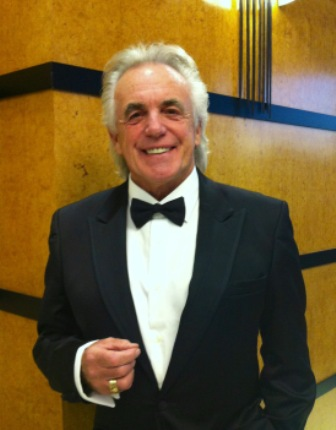
- Stringfellow in 2012
- Born: 17 October 1940; Sheffield, West Riding of Yorkshire England
- Died: 7 June 2018 (aged 77); London, England
- Education: Sheffield Central Technical College
- Known for: Nightclubs and Gentlemen's clubs
- Spouses: Norma Williams (m. 1960; div. 1965) Coral Wright (m. 1967; div. 1989) Bella Wright (m. 2009)
- Children: 4

Peter James Stringfellow (17 October 1940 – 7 June 2018) was an English businessman who owned several nightclubs.

== Early life ==
Stringfellow was born in the City General Hospital, Sheffield, West Riding of Yorkshire, on 17 October 1940, to Elsie Bowers and James William Stringfellow, a steelworker who served in the Royal Scots Greys during the Second World War. He was the eldest of four, having three younger brothers; Geoffrey, Paul and Terry.

The family lived in Andover Street, Pitsmoor, Sheffield, until 1948 when they had moved to Marshall Street, Pitsmoor. Peter Stringfellow attended Pye Bank Church of England Primary School. He failed his 11 plus and so attended Burngreave Secondary School for one year. He then passed the exam for Sheffield Central Technical College and he left three years later at the age of 15 with a 4th grade Technical Diploma.

== Career ==
When Stringfellow was 13 years old, he worked at a cinema on The Wicker arterial street in Sheffield. His first job after leaving school was as an assistant tie salesman at Austin Reed. After some casual jobs he enrolled as an apprentice in the Merchant Navy, at the age of 16. His Merchant Navy career lasted two years.

On his return to Sheffield, he worked briefly in various jobs. While at Dobson's Furnishings Company he was convicted of selling stolen carpets and served two weeks in Armley Prison, Leeds, in June 1962 and six weeks in Ford Open Prison.

After his conviction and imprisonment he was unable to find regular work. This led to his business career running clubs.

=== Nightclub management ===
In 1962, Stringfellow rented St Aidan's Church Hall in Sheffield every Friday night, operating the Black Cat Club. Several bands played in the club, such as the Pursuers, Dave Berry and the Cruisers, Johnny Tempest and the Cadillacs and from London, Screaming Lord Sutch, the Savages, Count Lindsay and Gene Vincent.

His fortunes changed when The Beatles played on 2 April 1963. The demand for concert tickets was so great that Stringfellow rented a larger venue, the Azena Ballroom in Sheffield. On that night he sent the Beatles a telegram congratulating them on their first album, Please Please Me.

In 1963, Stringfellow began another club, the Blue Moon, at St. John's Church Hall in Sheffield. The opening act was the Marauders who had a single, "That's What I Want", in the British top 50. More bands followed such as the Kinks. Other bands that played at the club and who later became famous were Freddie Starr and the Midnighters, the Searchers, Shane Fenton and the Fentones, Wayne Fontana, Long John Baldry and the Hoochie Coochie Men, Rod Stewart and the Soul Agents, Vance Arnold & The Avengers, Dean Marshall and the Deputies.

In 1964, Stringfellow opened the highly successful Mojo Club, later renamed the King Mojo Club in Sheffield. During its three and half years of business, many bands played at the club, including the Who, Pink Floyd, the Brian Auger Trinity, the Graham Bond Organisation, John Mayall's Bluesbreakers, the Yardbirds, Zoot Money's Big Roll Band, the Hollies, the Merseybeats, the Spencer Davis Group, the Pretty Things, Manfred Mann, the Small Faces, Georgie Fame and the Blue Flames, and the Jimi Hendrix Experience. Other American acts who played in the club included the first Tamla/Motown acts to play in the UK, Ben E. King, Sonny Boy Williamson, Tina Turner, Inez and Charlie Foxx, John Lee Hooker, and Little Stevie Wonder.

In 1968, he went into another business venture with Down Broadway, just under the Stylo's shoe shop in the centre of Sheffield.

On 4 November 1968, Jethro Tull was the first act to play at Down Broadway and John Peel was booked to play as the star DJ. Another progressive rock group, Yes, also played at the club. In 1969, Stringfellow acquired the first alcohol licence for another of his clubs called the Penthouse Sheffield. The club only lasted for a year due to trouble with overcrowding and objections from the local police. This prompted him to sell it and move to Leeds.

In 1970, he opened Cinderella's in Leeds. This was Stringfellow's first super club, mixing recorded music and live bands.

In 1972, Stringfellow acquired a space next door to Cinderella's to create another club called Rockafella's. This was the first and last of his super cabaret and super clubs. Comedy duo Mike and Bernie Winters and magician Paul Daniels performed at the club. The two clubs were combined in 1973 and given the name Cinderella Rockafella's, and Stringfellow dropped the cabaret and put in full-time DJs such as Chris Crossley and Peter Tyler. He and his brother, Paul Stringfellow, also served as DJs.

In 1976, Stringfellow and his then business partner and brother, Geoffrey Stringfellow, sold the Cinderella Rockafella's to Mecca and moved to Manchester, where they opened the Millionaire Club. There were no live bands in the Millionaire Club. However, the Stringfellows hired named DJs including Peter Tyler and Brett Sinclair.

In 1980, he sold the Millionaire Club to Granada Ltd and he then moved with his whole family to London. There he opened Stringfellows Covent Garden. It was an immediate success as a nightclub in London, where celebrities, international film stars, TV personalities, rock stars, models, paparazzi and national newspaper journalists partied for the next 15 years.

In 1983, he took over the old cabaret club, Talk of the Town, which had closed. He reopened it with its original name Hippodrome and it became the "World's Greatest Disco". The Hippodrome introduced its first gay night at the venue under his management. He also started Hippodrome Records and one of his acts to sign was Dusty Springfield who released the single, "Sometimes Like Butterflies".

In 1986, he opened Stringfellow's New York, which was frequented by New York celebrities and managed with his daughter Karen. In 1989, he opened Stringfellow's Miami, and then Stringfellow's Los Angeles in 1990. He sustained huge financial losses due to the American economic recession in 1989.

In 1996, Stringfellow's autobiography, King of Clubs, was published by Little, Brown. It was serialised in the Baltimore Sun newspaper and became a best-seller.

==== Adult clubbing ====
In 1990, Stringfellow introduced table dancing to his New York club with a licensing deal with Michael J. Peter. This became Stringfellow's Presents Pure Platinum. In 1996, Cabaret of Angels, a table-side dancing club was opened for three nights a week at Stringfellow's Covent Garden.

In 2006, Stringfellow opened his second adult entertainment club named Angels in Wardour Street, Soho. He was the first club owner to gain a fully nude licence from Westminster City Council. In 2009, he criticised the Policing and Crime Act 2009, saying the licensing changes with regards to lap dancing were "unnecessary" and he would be appealing to the European Court of Human Rights if his current licences were not renewed.

In 2012, he was granted the necessary sexual entertainment venue (SEV) Licence for Stringfellow's Covent Garden and Angels Soho, and was able to successfully market Angels as providing rooms for the entertainment "in privacy" of young women in lingerie.

== Television ==
Stringfellow first appeared on television as a warm-up act on Ready Steady Go! in 1964. He contributed to numerous programmes, both radio and television, in subsequent decades. Stringfellow appeared on Noel's House Party where he was gunged alongside Jimmy Savile. He appeared on the celebrity edition of Come Dine with Me, with the first broadcast on 17 September 2008. Stringfellow appeared in season 1, episode 2 on Trigger Happy TV. He also appeared in season 15 episode 1 of Top Gear, which was broadcast on 27 June 2010, where he had to help Jeremy Clarkson when he was stuck in a rolled over Reliant Robin.

== Personal life ==
Stringfellow married Norma Williams in 1960. They had a daughter, Karen, who was involved with Stringfellow's businesses for many years and is now a boutique owner in Florida. After Stringfellow and Williams divorced, he married Coral Wright in 1967. They had one son together before divorcing: Scott, a former racing car driver. He had a 12-year relationship with Frizzby Fox, which ended in 1996, and then for two years until 1998 with Helen Benoist. Stringfellow married Bella Wright in 2009. They had a daughter, Rosabella, in 2013 and a son, Angelo, in 2015.

Stringfellow had four grandchildren: Taylor, Jaime, Thomas and Teddy.

Stringfellow lived in Gerrards Cross, Cheadle Hulme and in Mallorca.

Stringfellow was a donor to the Conservative Party and supported a UKIP candidate in 2012, but he publicly disavowed the Conservative Party in 2018 over Brexit, stating that the "price is too high". He said he would support the Liberal Democrats if the Conservatives' advocacy of leaving the European Union continued.

Stringfellow was treated for lung cancer in 2008, but was diagnosed with terminal lung cancer in late 2017. He died in a London hospital on 7 June 2018 at the age of 77.
