= Abbeyfield Park =

Park in Pitsmoor, Sheffield, England

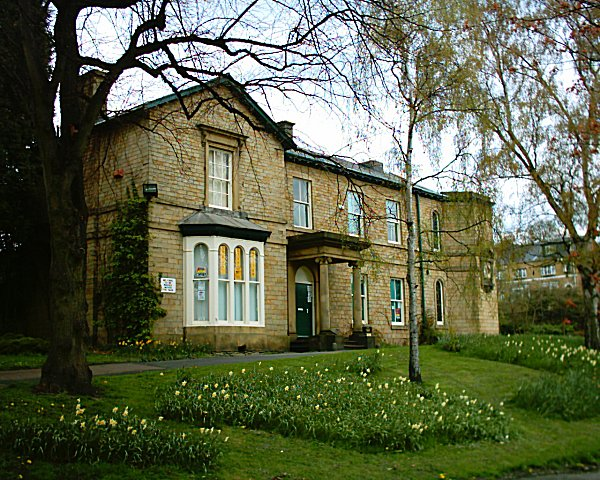
- Abbeyfield House in Abbeyfield Park, Sheffield

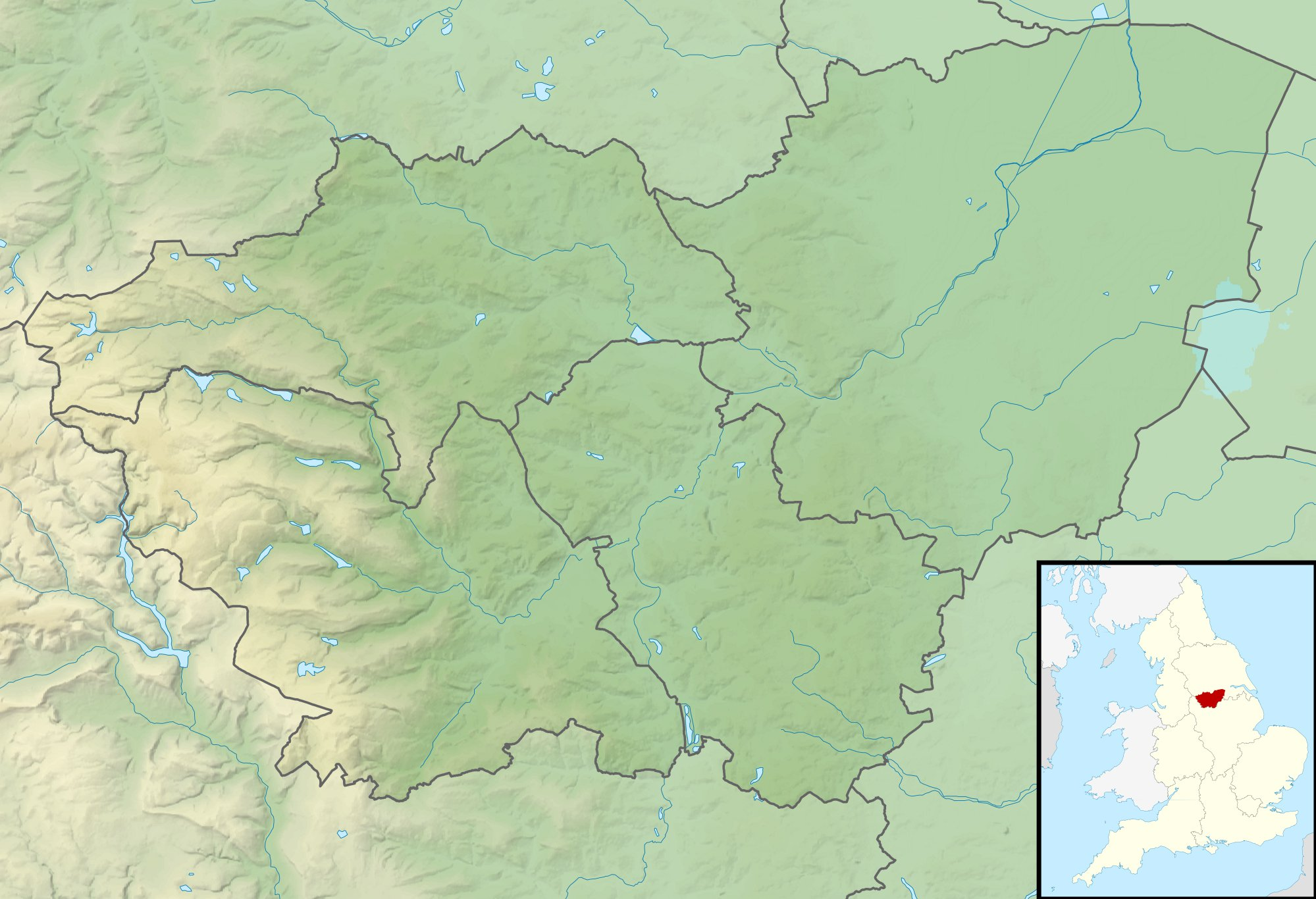
- Location within South Yorkshire
- Interactive map of Abbeyfield Park
- Location: Pitsmoor, Sheffield, South Yorkshire, England
- Coordinates: 53.40°N 1.464°W
- Created: 1909

Abbeyfield is a park in Pitsmoor, Sheffield, South Yorkshire, England, bought by the City Corporation in 1909. The park comprises the park itself, a bowling green, as well as Abbeyfield House, a former secondary school. Abbeyfield School opened in 1919 and was the first school to be built outside Sheffield city centre as a result of the 1902 Act. The number of pupils was high and the school soon proved to be too small, children being split in numerous classes in several neighbouring churches. Brush House was converted into a school and some classes moved to that location. Abbeyfield House closed in September 1927 and all pupils moved to Brushes, then called Firth Park Secondary School (which latterly became Firth Park Grammar School).

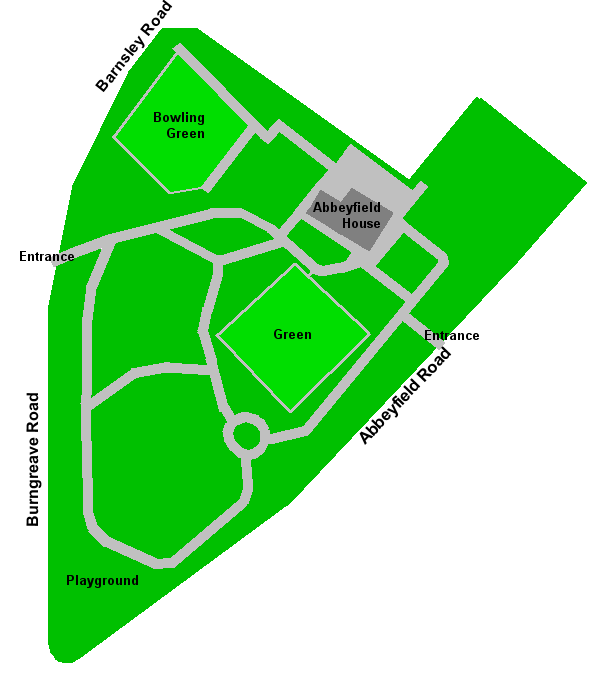
Plan of Abbeyfield Park.

Abbeyfield House became a public library.

Abbeyfield Park is home to the Abbeyfield Multicultural Festival, and has its side entrance made of sculpted steel. The forged entrance was designed by children of the area.
