= Pitsmoor =

Suburb of Sheffield, England

Coordinates: 53.400°N 1.456°W

- Location within Sheffield
- OS grid reference: SK362893
- Metropolitan borough: City of Sheffield
- Metropolitan county: South Yorkshire
- Region: Yorkshire and the Humber
- Country: England
- Sovereign state: United Kingdom
- Post town: SHEFFIELD
- Postcode district: S3–S4
- Dialling code: 0114
- Police: South Yorkshire
- Fire: South Yorkshire
- Ambulance: Yorkshire
- UK Parliament: Sheffield Brightside and Hillsborough

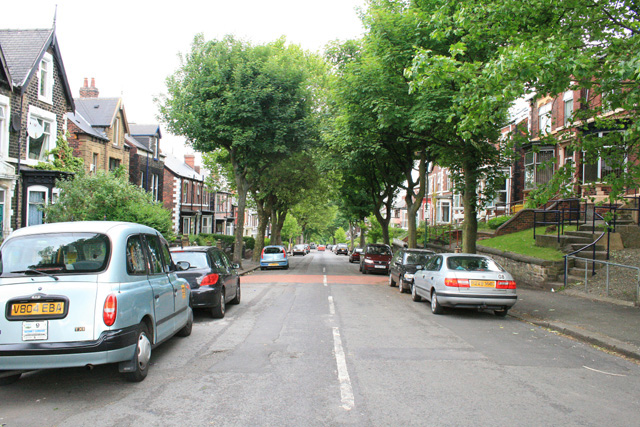
Abbeyfield Road in Pitsmoor.

Pitsmoor is a former village, now a suburb of Sheffield, England. The name derives from Or-pits as, anciently, the main local industry was the mining of ore. The village falls within the Burngreave ward of the city.

== History ==
In 1906, thirteen Roman coins were found in the suburb. In the late Middle Ages, the Duke of Norfolk was the lord of the manor and owned the large woods surrounding it, now almost all covered by housing. A coal mine was developed, with its entrance on what later became Grimesthorpe Road. Its outflow ran by the side of the lane as far as Burngreave Vestry Hall, where it was joined by a burn which rose in Old Park Wood.

A small number of old houses survive in Pitsmoor, including Abbeyfield House and Toll Bar Cottage, which was built in 1837 on what was then the main road from Sheffield to Barnsley, Wakefield and Leeds. A few more survive in Crabtree, formerly a separate hamlet, lying immediately north west of Pitsmoor. Christ Church was constructed to serve the area in 1850, which was made its own parish.

In the early 1900s houses were still being built in the area. If you take a walk up Burngreave Road from Spital Hill you can follow this progression uphill from the dates marked on the front of each villa on either side of the road. The people who lived in them were doctors, teachers, shopkeepers and business men. Pitsmoor was described as eminently respectable and a languorous and soothing suburb, in an article in the Sheffield Daily Telegraph in 1906. In 1909, Abbeyfield House and its grounds were purchased by Sheffield City Council for £10,500, the grounds becoming Abbeyfield Park. In 1913, another patch of land off Abbeyfield Road became Devon Gardens. The creation of these public green spaces was in aid of an urban population of factory workers who needed access to fresh air and space to exercise.

During the 1920s some of the back-to-back houses began to disappear but many of the courts persisted until after the Second World War. Areas around Verdon Street and Gower Street were still dominated by this type of housing.

The King Mojo Club was based in Pitsmoor.
