= Sheffield Central Technical School =

School in Sheffield, England

Coordinates: 53°22′54″N 1°28′19″W

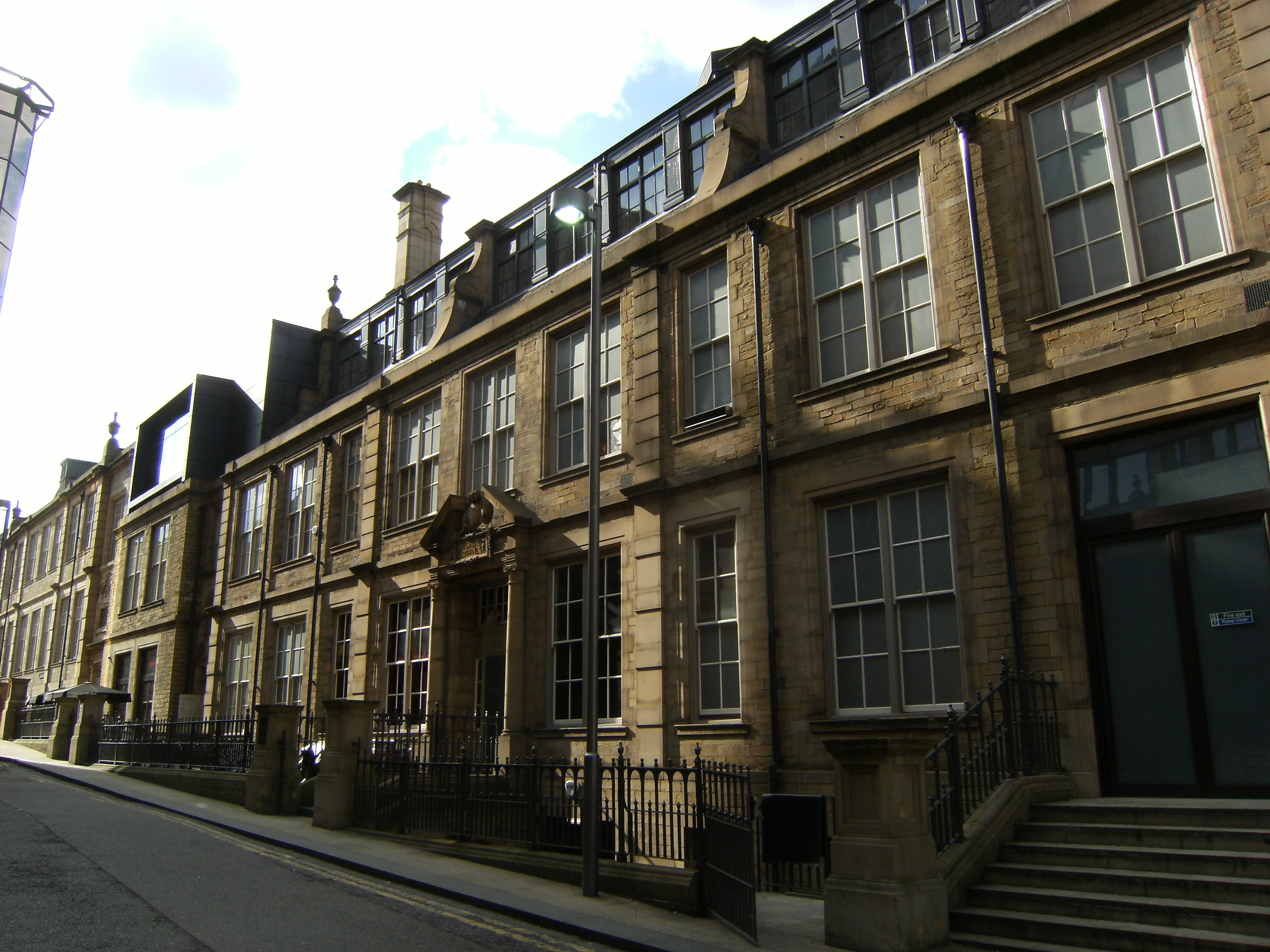
The former Sheffield Grammar School

The former Sheffield Central Technical School (CTS) was housed in the collection of buildings now called Leopold Square in the city centre of Sheffield, South Yorkshire, England. The complex of buildings home to the school is bounded by Leopold Street, West Street, Orchard Lane, and Holly Street.

== Origin ==
During the late 19th century Sheffield city centre underwent a significant redevelopment. Along with concepts of mass production the industrial revolution encouraged the development of mass education. This collection of education buildings was the synthesis of this concept in Sheffield. The Schools were established to provide a technical knowledge base to support the emerging manufacturing industries of the age and no doubt have contributed to Sheffield’s position as the most significant steel manufacturing city in the world.

== History ==
The key buildings on the site were built between 1874 and 1894. The buildings are robust ornate stone structures typical of the civic architecture of the time generally described as English Renaissance Revivalist in style.

Initial drawings for the Central Schools development were produced following the Education Act of 1870, the buildings were also to house the Sheffield Schools Board formed out of the Act. The construction was to commence in 1876 following acquisition of the land which was formerly home to workshops, and terrace housing.

The first buildings on the site were designed by Local Architect T R Flockton in collaboration with E R Robson and were technically advanced for their time incorporating heating and ventilation techniques that were rarely seen, not only distributing warm/cool air but also purifying the incoming air from the many external pollutants. The Houses of Parliament in London was the only other building of the time to utilise such technology.

The site was initially home to the Firth College, the Central Technical Schools and the Sheffield Schools Board. These first buildings were completed by 1880. The Firth College is specifically notable for its benefactor: Mark Firth - a successful local steel manufacturer and philanthropist, and for later becoming the University of Sheffield following its amalgamation with the Technical School and Medical School in Sheffield in 1897 and moving to a new larger site 8 years later.

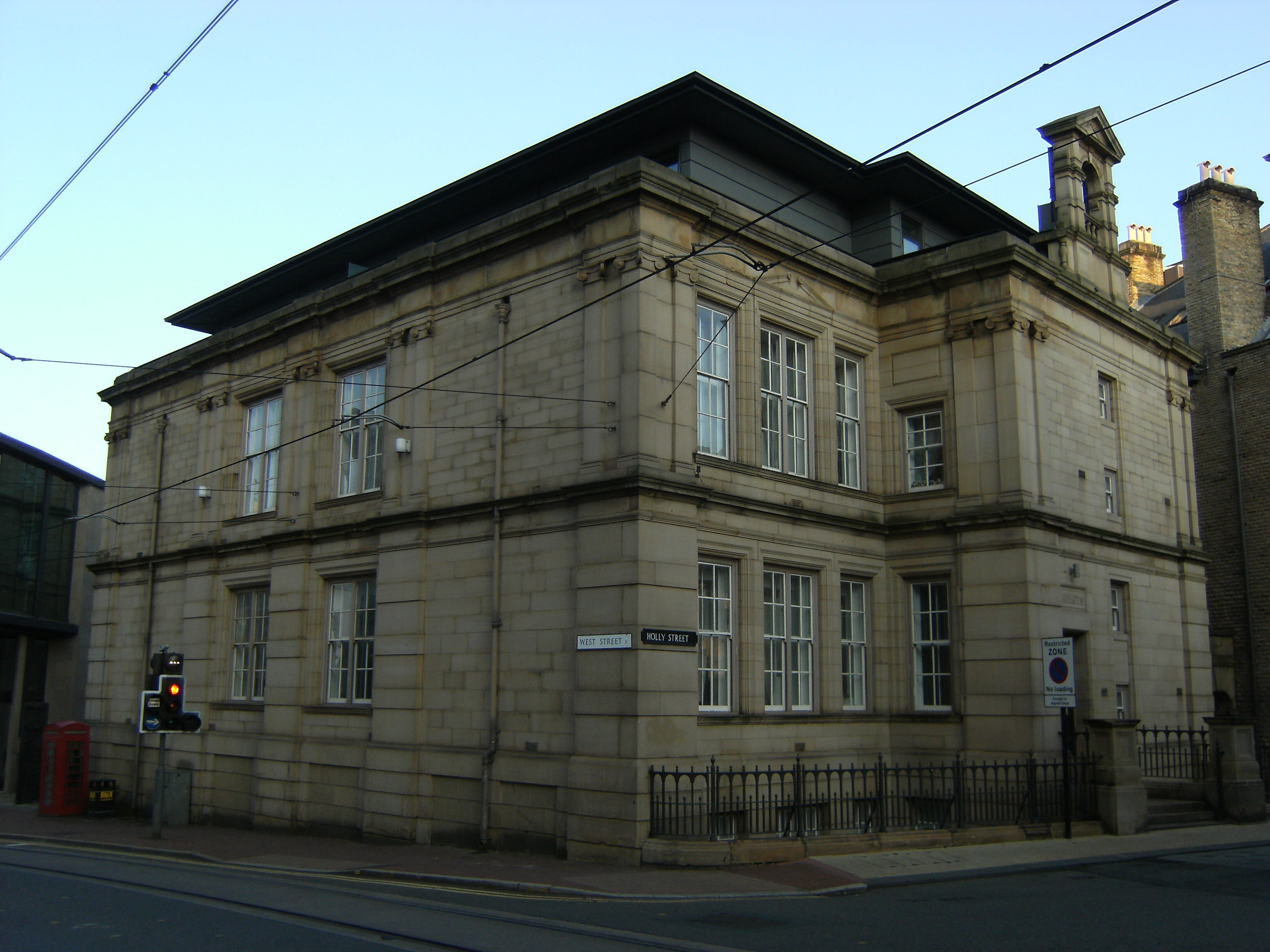
Former infants school

The school was extended between 1894 and 1899 with a building on Bow Street (no longer a road) to form an infants school with a rooftop playground, and the Pupil Teacher Centre on Holly Street which was built in a Gothic Revival style of architecture by H W Lockwood.

As Urban populations migrated to the suburbs throughout the twentieth century the role of the Central School increasingly became unworkable, eventually leading to its closure in the 1930s. The school re-opened as High Storrs School in Ecclesall, and the association for former pupils of High Storrs retains the historical connection in its name, the Old Centralians.

There were two commemorative plaques erected detailing the buildings' history. The wording is reproduced here:

THE CITY OF SHEFFIELD EDUCATION OFFICES. OPENED IN 1879 AS FIRTH COLLEGE THROUGH THE GENEROSITY OF MARK FIRTH (1819–1980), AN EMINENT LOCAL STEEL MAKER AND MANUFACTURER, THE COLLEGE WAS A CENTRE FOR POPULAR LECTURES AND UNIVERSITY EXTENSION CLASSES AND, ALONGSIDE SHEFFIELD MEDICAL SCHOOL, WAS THE FORERUNNER OF THE UNIVERSITY OF SHEFFIELD. FROM 1905 TO 1963, THESE BUILDINGS SERVED AS PREMISES FOR A VARIETY OF LOCAL SCHOOLS, THE LAST OF WHICH WAS THE CENTRAL TECHNICAL SCHOOL FOR BOYS.

THIS PLAQUE WAS SPONSORED BY STONES BITTER.

and

THE CITY OF SHEFFIELD EDUCATION OFFICES. FROM 1933 TO 1964 FIRTH BUILDING WAS USED BY THE CENTRAL TECHNICAL SCHOOL, FORMERLY THE JUNIOR TECHNICAL SCHOOL. DURING THAT TIME, OVER 15,000 BOYS PASSED THROUGH THE SCHOOL, MANY PROGRESSING TO SUCCESSFUL CAREERS IN THE STEEL, ENGINEERING AND BUILDING INDUSTRIES OF THE REGION. THE FIRST HEADMASTER, GWILYM E. THOMAS, WAS SUCCEEDED BY HERBERT W. WADGE M.B.E. WHO WAS PROMINENT IN THE DEVELOPMENT OF SECONDARY TECHNICAL EDUCATION IN THIS COUNTRY. HERBERT WADGE HAD A PROFOUND LIFE-LONG INFLUENCE ON ALL HIS PUPILS.

FLOURISH CTS FOR EVER

THIS PLAQUE HAS BEEN SPONSORED BY C.T.S. OLD BOYS ASSOCIATION. GOLDEN JUBILEE YEAR 1996

"Flourish CTS for ever" is a reference to the refrain of the School's song which was written by Wadge. (Some have noted, here, a similarity to the school song of Westminster College 'From the Cheviots down to Dover')

== Ethos ==
In 1947, Herbert Willan Wadge, MBE (1956 Birthday Honours list) took up the appointment of headmaster of CTS following his move from headmaster of the Junior Technical School, Enfield (a department of Enfield Technical College). He imported the house system that existed at Enfield, naming the four houses "Bessemer", "Faraday", "Stephenson", and ”Telford". Under him, CTS selected its (single-sex) pupils from across the city by means of an entrance examination at age 13 years. There were two streams: "Engineering" and "Building" to cater to the city's industrial nature. There was an emphasis on both the practical and the academic with courses such as Pattern Making/Foundry Practice and Brickwork. The school offered its own diploma for those leaving before taking nationally recognised qualifications at 'O' and 'A' levels.

== Later development ==
The Leopold Street/West Street site was home to the city's education offices together with the Sheffield City Grammar School and the Central Technical School. It was quite compact. Consequently, the playing fields for the schools were located at two sites at Ringinglow. As the Central Technical School expanded, additional premises were found in Queens Street near the corner of Silver Street, not far from Sheffield Cathedral. "Cathedral School" provided a school meals service and additional class rooms. Space at the school was at such a premium that tin-smithing and plumbing were taught in a building on Arundel Street adjacent to the rear of the Central Library (Sheffield) upstairs was a bakehouse where cooking & baking were taught but not to the Central Technical school students. Eventually, in the early 1960s, the City Grammar School was relocated to Stradbroke and was later renamed "The City School (Sheffield)". Shortly afterward, in 1964, CTS was relocated under its existing headmaster, Herbert Willan Wadge, to its own purpose-built premises on the outskirts of the city at Gleadless Road, Gleadless. Peter Dixon, took over as headmaster in 1965 and the school eventually became co-educational in 1968, merging with the adjacent Hurlfield Girls School and changing its name to 'Ashleigh School'. In 1988 Ashleigh School merged with Hurlfield School and became 'Myrtle Springs School'. The former Hurlfield Girls site was not required as part of the merger and demolished, and in the mid 1990s the former CTS site became redundant and was also later demolished to make way for houses. The original buildings in Leopold Street were occupied by the education offices of Sheffield City Council up until 2001 when it was redeveloped into apartments, a hotel, and bars/restaurants, by local architects Axis Architecture.
