= Josh Hadar =

American artist and sculptor

Josh Hadar is an American artist and sculptor. He is best known for. dynamic, moving works of art such as motorized bicycles in metal and glass.

== Career ==
In 2010, Hadar created a solar powered three wheel sculpture known as the E-Trike. In 2011 Hadar's first solo exhibition, The Evolution of Steel, was held during the "Festival of Ideas for the New City", at the New Museum in New York City, and showcased multiple years of his eco conscious steel bikes and solar powered installations. The exhibition was covered by Core77, which described his practice as “crafting some of the wildest steel fabrications we've ever seen."
