= Bernard Charles Cotton =

Australian malacologist and museum curator

- Born: February 2, 1905; Sheffield, Yorkshire, England
- Died: May 3, 1966 (aged 61); Adelaide, South Australia
- Education: Abbeyfield House, Sheffield
- Known for: South Australian Mollusca, taxonomy of Australian shells
- Scientific career
- Fields: Malacology, Conchology
- Institutions: South Australian Museum
- Patrons: Joseph Verco
- Author abbrev. (zoology): Cotton

Bernard Charles Cotton (2 February 1905 – 3 May 1966) was an Australian malacologist and museum curator of British origin.

== Life ==
Cotton was born in Sheffield, Yorkshire, where he was educated at Abbeyfield House. He immigrated, with his parents, to South Australia in 1923. Within a few months of his arrival he joined the staff of the South Australian Museum in Adelaide as a cadet to assist the museum's honorary conchologist, Sir Joseph Verco. In 1928 he was appointed Assistant Conchologist and in 1934 became Curator of Molluscs. He retired from the museum in 1962 because of ill health. He died in 1966.

== Honours and awards ==
- Fellow of the Royal Society of South Australia (1929)
- Australian Natural History Medallion (1950)
- Honorary Life Member, Field Naturalists Society of South Australia (1964)
- Foundation Patron of the Malacological Society of Australia
- Fellow and Honorary Life Member of the Royal Zoological Society of New South Wales

== Publications ==
As well as numerous scientific papers, mainly in the field of Australian malacology, publications authored, co-authored or edited by Cotton include:

- Cotton, Bernard; & Godfrey, Frank K. (1938). The Molluscs of South Australia. Part I. The Pelecypoda. Government Printer: Adelaide.
- Cotton, Bernard; & Godfrey, Frank K. (1940). The Molluscs of South Australia. Part II. Government Printer: Adelaide.
- Cotton, Bernard C.; & Godfrey, Frank K. (1943). A systematic list of the Echinodermata, Foraminifera, Hydroida, Brachiopoda of southern Australia. (Publication no.3). Malacological Society of South Australia.
- Cotton, Bernard Charles. (1950). Pleistocene Land and Fresh Water Shells of South Australia. South Australian Museum.
- Cotton, Bernard C. (Editor). (1953). National Park and Reserves. An Account of the National Park and Reserves situated near Adelaide, South Australia. Commissioners of the National Park, Adelaide.
- Cotton, Bernard C. (1957). South Australian Shells. South Australian Museum.
- Cotton, Bernard C. (1959). South Australian Mollusca: Archaegastropoda. (Series: Flora and Fauna of South Australia). South Australian Branch of the British Science Guild.
- Cotton, Bernard C. (1961). South Australian Mollusca: Pelecypoda. Government Printer: Adelaide. (Series: Flora and Fauna of South Australia).
- Cotton, Bernard C. (1964). South Australian Mollusca: Chitons. (Series: Flora and Fauna of South Australia). South Australian Government: Adelaide.
- Cotton, Bernard C. (Editor). (1964). South Australian National Park and Reserves. Commissioners of the National Park and Wildlife Reserves, Adelaide.
- Cotton, Bernard C. (Editor). (1966). Aboriginal man in South and Central Australia. Government Printer: Adelaide.
