= Scheduled monuments in South Yorkshire =

This is a list of scheduled monuments in South Yorkshire, a metropolitan county in England.

In the United Kingdom, a scheduled monument is a "nationally important" archaeological site or historic building that has been given protection against unauthorised change by being placed on a list (or "schedule") by the Secretary of State for Culture, Media and Sport; English Heritage takes the leading role in identifying such sites. Scheduled monuments are defined in the Ancient Monuments and Archaeological Areas Act 1979 and the National Heritage Act 1983. There are about 20,000 scheduled monument entries on the list, which is maintained by English Heritage; more than one site can be included in a single entry.

While a scheduled monument can also be recognised as a listed building, English Heritage considers listed building status as a better way of protecting buildings than scheduled monument status. If a monument is considered by English Heritage to "no longer merit scheduling" it can be descheduled.

== List of scheduled monuments ==
Image	Name	Remains	Location	Notes	Description
	Abbeydale Industrial Hamlet		Abbeydale, Sheffield		
	Ash Cabin Flat Stone Circle		Wyming Brook, Sheffield	Bronze Age stone circle	
	Bailey Hill		High Bradfield, Sheffield	Motte and bailey	
	Bamford House Round Cairn		Near Derwent, Derbyshire		
	Bar Dyke		Agden, Sheffield	Linear earthwork	
	Beauchief Abbey		Beauchief, Sheffield	Inner precinct and fishponds	
	Bole Hill Lead Smelting Site		Totley Moor, Sheffield		
	Bolsterstone Glass Furnace		Bolsterstone, Sheffield		
	Broomhead Moor Cairnfield		Agden, Sheffield		
	Burbage Bridge Cairn (380m SW)		Hathersage Moor, Sheffield	Bronze Age stone cairn	
	Burbage Bridge Cairn (500m NW)		Hathersage Moor, Sheffield	Bronze Age stone cairn	
	Bower Spring Cementation Furnace		St Vincent's Quarter, Sheffield		
	Caesar's Camp or Castle Holmes		Scholes Coppice, Rotherham	Iron Age fort	
	Carl Wark		Hathersage Moor, Sheffield		
	Cowell Flat Prehistoric Field System		Agden, Sheffield		
	Castle Hill		High Bradfield, Sheffield		
	Ciceley Low		Houndkirk Moor, Sheffield	Two ring cairns	
	Cup and ring marked rock		Ecclesall Woods, Sheffield		
	Darnall Works and Don Valley Glassworks		Darnall, Sheffield		
	Derwent Packhorse Bridge		Derwent, Derbyshire	Partly in South Yorkshire	
	Doncaster Street Cementation Furnace		Netherthorpe, Sheffield		
	Handlands		Grenoside, Sheffield	Romano-British settlement	
	Hoffman Kiln		Abbeydale, Sheffield	Brick kiln off Aizlewood Road	
	Lady Cross		Langsett Moor, Barnsley		
	Little Matlock Rolling Mill		Malin Bridge, Sheffield	Earthworks, remains of the rolling mill, and water system	
	Manor Lodge		Manor Park, Sheffield		
	Margery Hill Round Cairn		Margery Hill, Sheffield		
	Mortimer House Ring Cairn		Agden, Sheffield		
	Mousehole Forge		Malin Bridge, Sheffield		
	New Cross		Bradfield Moor, Sheffield		
	Norton Cross		Norton, Sheffield		
	Redmires First World War Training Area		Redmires, Sheffield		
	Roman Rig Jenkin Lane to Tyler Street section		Wincobank, Sheffield	550-metre section of earthworks	
	Roman Rig Wincobank Hill section		Wincobank, Sheffield	160-metre section of earthworks	
	Shepherd Wheel		Whiteley Woods, Sheffield		
	Toad's Mouth Field System		Hathersage Moor, Sheffield		
	Wharncliffe Rocks		Deepcar, Sheffield	Iron Age and Roman quern workings	
	Wheata Wood		Grenoside, Sheffield	Romano-British field system and settlement	
	Willow Garth		Ecclesfield, Sheffield	Moated site and fishpond	
	Wincobank		Wincobank, Sheffield	Late-Bronze Age or early-Iron Age hill fort and World War II gun and searchlight emplacement	
	Winyards Nick Cairn (SE of Mitchell Field)		Hathersage Moor, Sheffield		
	Winyards Nick Cairn (SW of Carl Wark)		Hathersage Moor, Sheffield		
	Winyards Nick Field System		Hathersage Moor, Sheffield		
