= Listed buildings in Sheffield S9 =

The S9 district lies within the City of Sheffield, South Yorkshire, England. The district contains 52 listed buildings that are recorded in the National Heritage List for England. Of these, 3 are listed at Grade II*, the middle grade, and the others are at Grade II, the lowest grade. The district is in the north east of the city of Sheffield, and covers the areas of Attercliffe, Brightside, Carbrook, Darnall, Meadowhall, Tinsley and Wincobank.

For neighbouring areas, see listed buildings in S2, listed buildings in S4, listed buildings in S5, listed buildings in S13, listed buildings in Brinsworth, listed buildings in Rotherham (Boston Castle Ward), listed buildings in Rotherham (Keppel Ward) and listed buildings in Rotherham (West Ward).

== Key ==
Grade	Criteria
II*	Particularly important buildings of more than special interest
II	Buildings of national importance and special interest

== Buildings ==
Name and location	Street	Photograph	Date	Notes	Grade
Carbrook Hall; 53.40550°N 1.41660°W	Attercliffe Common		About 1620		II*
Attercliffe Chapel; 53.39921°N 1.42709°W	Attercliffe Common		1629		II
Benjamin Huntsman Tomb; 53.39904°N 1.42673°W	Attercliffe Common		1760	In Attercliffe Chapel Cemetery	II
The Britannia; 53.39509°N 1.42958°W	Worksop Road		1772		II
5 Birch Road; 53.39186°N 1.43940°W	Birch Road		About 1805		II
Bacon Lane Bridge; 53.38925°N 1.43973°W	Bacon Lane		1819		II
Darnall Canal Aqueduct; 53.39353°N 1.42509°W	Worksop Road		1819	Designed by William Chapman	II
Attercliffe National School; 53.39546°N 1.43055°W	Attercliffe Road		1824		II
Sandersons Weir; 53.39574°N 1.44150°W	East Coast Road		1825		II
G. S. Dilley and Sons Warehouse; 53.38765°N 1.44476°W	Effingham Road		Mid 19th century		II
High Hazels House; 53.38609°N 1.40047°W	Infield Lane		Mid 19th century		II
Baltic Works; 53.39023°N 1.43868°W	Effingham Road		1854		II
Darnall Works South East Crucible Steel Shops; 53.39091°N 1.42261°W	Darnall Road		1871		II*
Darnall Works Crucible Steel Shops; 53.39081°N 1.42298°W	Darnall Road		1872		II*
Darnall Works Lodge, Weighbridge Cabin and Walls; 53.39229°N 1.42121°W	Darnall Road		1872		II
Darnall Works Offices; 53.39208°N 1.42168°W	Darnall Road		1872		II
Carbrook School Workshops Wall; 53.40167°N 1.42163°W	Attercliffe Common		1874	Designed by Innocent and Brown	II
Darnall School Front Range and Wall; 53.39025°N 1.41796°W	Darnall Road		1874	Designed by Innocent and Brown	II
Tinsley Tram Depot; 53.40791°N 1.41294°W	Sheffield Road		1874		II
Crucible Steel Works; 53.38989°N 1.44022°W	Stoke Street		Late 19th century		II
Sewer Gas Lamp; 53.41449°N 1.42412°W	Jenkin Road		Late 19th century	At junction with Tipton Lane	II
St Thomas; 53.42122°N 1.41873°W	Newman Road		1876	Designed by Flockton & Abbot	II
St Thomas Walls and Gates; 53.42108°N 1.41863°W	Newman Road		1876	Designed by Flockton & Abbot	II
Carbrook School Workshops; 53.40161°N 1.42134°W	Attercliffe Common		1877	Designed by Innocent and Brown	II
St Lawrence; 53.41111°N 1.39325°W	St Lawrence Road		1879	Designed by G. E. Street	II
St Lawrence Lych Gate and Walls; 53.41091°N 1.39337°W	St Lawrence Road		1877	Designed by G. E. Street	II
Brightside School; 53.41148°N 1.42100°W	Jenkin Road		1880	Designed by E. R. Robson	II
Brightside School House; 53.41179°N 1.42084°W	Jenkin Road		1880	Designed by E. R. Robson	II
Brightside School Railing, Wall and Gates; 53.41175°N 1.42048°W	Jenkin Road		1880	Designed by E. R. Robson	II
Tinsley Park Cemetery Chapels; 53.39329°N 1.40748°W	Barleywood Road		1880	Designed by Holmes and Johnson	II
Tinsley Park Cemetery Lodge, Gateway and Wall; 53.39320°N 1.40851°W	Barleywood Road		1880	Designed by Holmes and Johnson	II
Huntsman & Co Crucible Steel Melting Shop; 53.39689°N 1.42055°W	Coleridge Road		About 1890		II
Darnall School Middle Range and Wall; 53.39009°N 1.41827°W	Darnall Road		1892	Designed by C. J. Innocent	II
Darnall School Rear Range; 53.38971°N 1.41815°W	Darnall Road		1892	Designed by C. J. Innocent	II
629 Attercliffe Road; 53.39346°N 1.43245°W	Attercliffe Road		1899		II
580 Attercliffe Road; 53.39223°N 1.43455°W	Attercliffe Road		About 1900		II
Royal Bank of Scotland; 53.39546°N 1.43046°W	Attercliffe Road		1901		II
Coleridge Road School; 53.39750°N 1.41831°W	Tinsley Park Road		1903	Designed by Holmes and Watson	II
Coleridge Road School Caretakers House and Wall; 53.39740°N 1.41883°W	Tinsley Park Road		1903	Designed by Holmes and Watson	II
Coleridge Road School Wall and Gates; 53.39765°N 1.41852°W	Tinsley Park Road		1903	Designed by Holmes and Watson	II
Kettlebridge School; 53.38832°N 1.42593°W	Ouseburn Road		1904	Designed by William John Hale	II
Kettlebridge School Caretakers House and Gates; 53.38870°N 1.42667°W	Ouseburn Road		1904	Designed by William John Hale	II
The Ball; 53.39030°N 1.41715°W	Darnall Road		1904		II
Kettlebridge School Railing and Gates; 53.38795°N 1.42604°W	Ouseburn Road		1904	Designed by William John Hale	II
762 and 764 Attercliffe Road; 53.39520°N 1.43015°W	Attercliffe Road		1905		II
Vickers Building; 53.40658°N 1.42562°W	Brightside Lane		1906	Designed by A. F. Watson	II
Darnall Works Heat Treatment Workshop; 53.39294°N 1.42439°W	Darnall Road		1913		II
Darnall Works Steel Working Shop; 53.39277°N 1.42355°W	Darnall Road		1913		II
Adelphi Cinema; 53.39608°N 1.43002°W	Vicarage Road		1920		II
Tinsley Park Cemetery War Memorial; 53.39354°N 1.40353°W	Barleywood Road		1920	Designed by Reginald Blomfield	II
River Don Works Wall Facing Vickers Building; 53.40626°N 1.42566°W	Brightside Lane		Early 20th century		II
St Margaret; 53.41354°N 1.42396°W	Jenkin Road		1934	Designed by Flockton & Son	II
