= Listed buildings in Sheffield S5 =

The S5 district lies within the City of Sheffield, South Yorkshire, England. The district contains 18 listed buildings that are recorded in the National Heritage List for England. Of these, one is listed at Grade II*, the middle grade, and the others are at Grade II, the lowest grade. The district is in the north of the city of Sheffield, and includes the areas of Firth Park, Fir Vale, Longley, Parson Cross, Shirecliffe, Shiregreen, Southey Green and Wadsley Bridge.

For neighbouring areas, see listed buildings in S3, listed buildings in S4, listed buildings in S6, listed buildings in S9, listed buildings in S35 and listed buildings in Rotherham (Keppel Ward).

== Key ==
Grade	Criteria
II*	Particularly important buildings of more than special interest
II	Buildings of national importance and special interest

== Buildings ==
Name and location	Street	Photograph	Date	Notes	Grade
2 Hatfield House Court; 53.42428°N 1.45060°W	Hatfield House Croft		Late 16th century		II
Concord Park Barn; 53.42584°N 1.43966°W	Oaks Lane		Early 17th century		II
Abbey Grange Nursing Home; 53.41105°N 1.44739°W	Cammel Road		Late 18th century	Formerly Page Hall	II
1–7 Hatfield House Croft; 53.42446°N 1.45029°W	Hatfield House Croft		Late 18th century		II
Longley Hall; 53.41510°N 1.46119°W	Longley Lane		Late 18th century		II
Goddard Hall; 53.40834°N 1.45791°W	Herries Road		Early 19th century	Now part of the Northern General Hospital	II
Wincobank Chapel; 53.41728°N 1.43420°W	Wincobank Avenue		1841		II
Five Arches; 53.41264°N 1.49306°W	Herries Road		1845	Designed by Joseph Locke	II
Firth Park Lodge and Pavilion; 53.41317°N 1.44447°W	Firth Park Road		Mid 19th century		II
Norwood Grange Cottage, Barn, Coach House and Stables; 53.41177°N 1.46435°W	Longley Lane		Mid 19th century		II
Sewer Gas Lamp; 53.41843°N 1.43446°W	Shiregreen Lane		Late 19th century	At junction with Monckton Road	II
Fir Vale Trinity Methodist Church; 53.40805°N 1.44994°W	Firth Park Road		About 1890		II
Chesterman House and Wycliffe House; 53.40779°N 1.45765°W	Herries Road		1894	Designed by C. J. Innocent	II
St Cuthbert; 53.40784°N 1.45154°W	Barnsley Road		1904	Designed by John Dodsley Webster and Son	II
Firth Park Methodist Church; 53.41851°N 1.44830°W	Stubbin Lane		1911	Designed by F. W. Chapman and J. Mansell Jenkinson	II
St James and St Christopher; 53.42871°N 1.44233°W	Bellhouse Road		1941		II
St James and St Christopher Wall and Gates; 53.42865°N 1.44203°W	Bellhouse Road		1941		II
St Paul; 53.43317°N 1.46930°W	Wordsworth Avenue		1959	Designed by Basil Spence	II*
