= Templeborough =

Suburb of Rotherham, South Yorkshire, England

Coordinates: 53.4187°N 1.388°W

- Location within South Yorkshire
- OS grid reference: SK 410 916
- Metropolitan borough: Rotherham
- Metropolitan county: South Yorkshire
- Region: Yorkshire and the Humber
- Country: England
- Sovereign state: United Kingdom
- Post town: ROTHERHAM
- Postcode district: S60
- Dialling code: 01709
- Police: South Yorkshire
- Fire: South Yorkshire
- Ambulance: Yorkshire
- UK Parliament: Rotherham

Templeborough (historically Templebrough) is a suburb of Rotherham, South Yorkshire, England. The suburb falls within the Brinsworth and Catcliffe ward of Rotherham Metropolitan Borough Council. The area takes its name from the remains of the Roman fort found there, which were mistakenly believed to be that of a Roman temple.

== Roman fort ==
Templeborough Roman Fort visualised 3D flythrough from Rotherham Museums

A Roman fort was first built on the site in earth and wood in the 1st century AD (most likely between the years 43 to 68) and was later rebuilt in stone. It is thought to have been occupied until the Roman withdrawal from Britain c. 410, but its original name has never been ascertained. The Roman road called Icknield Street (sometimes Ryknild or Riknild Street) crossed the River Don at a ford close to the fort. There was also a road named Batham Gate that ran southwest from the fort to Navio a signal station at Brough-on-Noe in Derbyshire. The double bank that surrounded the fort was still visible in 1831 although it is believed that stone blocks from the site were regularly carried off and re-used in nearby buildings.

Archaeological excavations of part of the fort and bath house were carried out in 1877 by the Rotherham Literary and Scientific Society headed by local historians, J. D. Leader and John Guest. They found evidence that the fort had been burned to the ground and rebuilt twice. Coins discovered during the excavation ranged in date from the time of the emperors Augustus to Constantine I.

In 1916, the site of the fort was acquired by Steel, Peech and Tozer's steelworks in order to expand their works to meet the demand for steel during the First World War. The plans for the steelworks required the site to be levelled, and 10–15 feet of soil were removed from the area of the fort, destroying all archaeological remains. However, before the works were constructed, an archaeologist specialising in Roman remains, Thomas May, was invited by Rotherham Corporation to re-excavate the fort over the course of eight months from November 1916 to July 1917.

A tile stamped with the stamp of Cohors IV Gallorum found on the site dates to either the time of Domitian (81–96) or Trajan (98–117). The Fourth Cohort of Gauls are known to have occupied the fort, as evidenced by the clay tiles and carved Roman tombstones discovered on the site. The remains include one of the earliest known memorials to a named British female.

Notable among the finds were:

- the tombstone of a soldier inscribed DIS M CINTVSMVS M COH IIII GALLORVM POS MELISVS ("To the spirits of the departed and Cintusmus, a soldier of the Fourth Cohort of Gauls, [this memorial was] placed by Melisus")
- the tombstone of a veteran inscribed DIS MANIBVS CROTO VINDICIS EMERITO COH IIII GALLORVM ANNORVM XXXX MONIMENTVM FECIT FLAVIA PEREGRINA CONIVNX PIENTISSIMA MARITO PIENTISSIMO TITVLVM POSVIT ("To the spirits of the departed and Crotus Vindex, veteran of the Fourth Cohort of Gauls, forty years old, this monument was made and its inscription set down by Flavia Peregrina, a most faithful wife for a most faithful husband")
- the tombstone of a Dobunni woman inscribed DIS M VERECVD RVFI LIA CIVES DOBVNNA ANNOR XXXV EXCINGVS CONIVX CONIVGI KARISSIMAE POSIT DE SVO ("To the spirits of the departed and to Verecunda Rufilia, a citizen of the Dobunni, thirty-five years old, her husband Excingus placed this for his dearest wife")

Finds from both excavations are now housed in Clifton Park Museum in Rotherham. The original stone columns from the Roman granary at Templeborough Fort were re-erected in Clifton Park in 1922.

== Templeborough steelworks ==
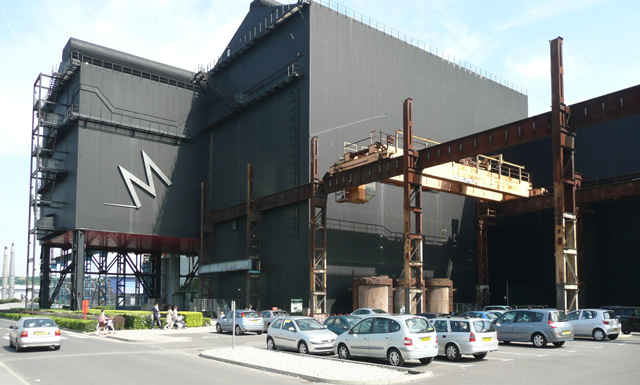
Magna Science Adventure Centre, 2008

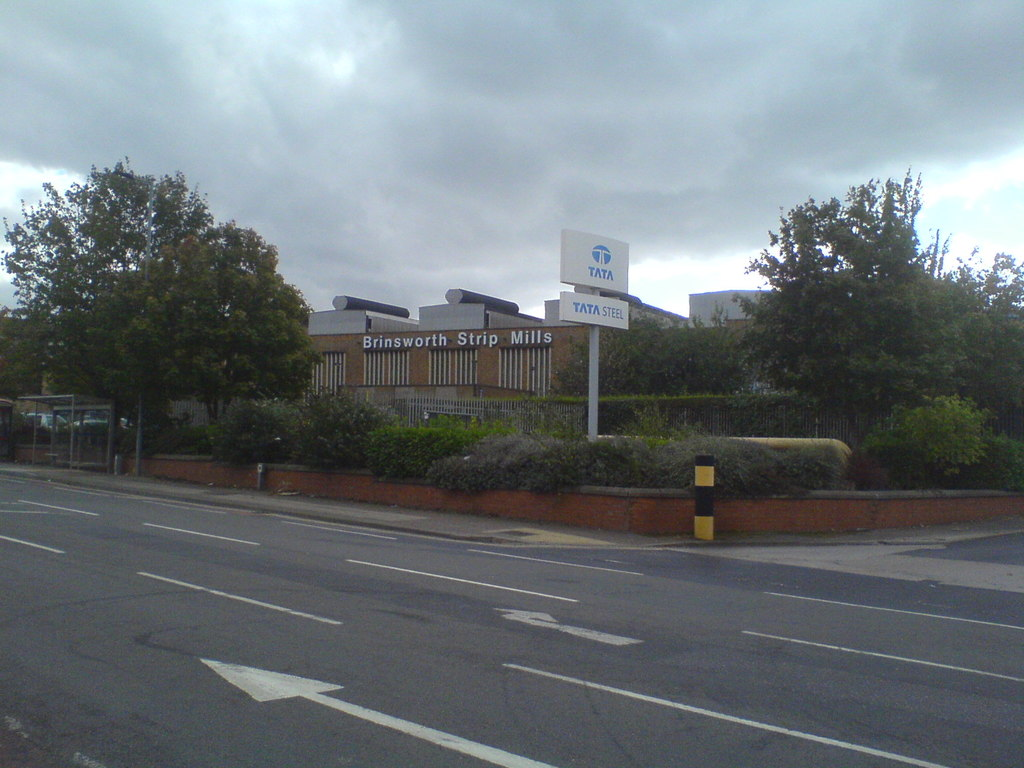
Brinsworth Strip Mills, 2016

Steel, Peech and Tozer, known locally as "Steelos" was one of the largest manufacturers in the Rotherham area. In 1918 they merged with Samuel Fox and Company, based in Stocksbridge and Appleby-Frodingham Steel Company in Scunthorpe creating United Steel Companies (USC). The Templeborough steelworks was reputed to be a mile long. At its height in the mid-20th century, the company employed 10,000 people. In the 1950s as Templeborough's open hearth furnaces had become outdated USC set up “Operation SPEAR” (Steel Peech Electric Arc Reorganization), to introduce six modern electric arc furnaces to replace the 14 open hearth furnaces. This resulted in Templeborough Melting Shop becoming the largest electric arc steel making plant in the world: they were capable of producing 1.8 million tons per year. USC also employed the cybernetician Stafford Beer to run a simulation of a "cybernetic factory".

After nationalisation in 1967 it became part of the British Steel Corporation. The steelworks closed in 1993 and has since been partly converted into a museum—the £46 million Magna Centre. The only remaining Steel, Peech and Tozer plant is Brinsworth Strip Mills, located on Sheffield Road, which is now part of Liberty Speciality Steels.

== See also ==
- Roman Rig
- Wincobank (hill fort)
