= Tom May =

Thomas or Tom May may refer to:

== Politicians ==
- Thomas May (Royalist) (1604–1655), MP for Midhurst, 1640–1642
- Sir Thomas May (MP for Chichester) (c.1645–1718), MP for Chichester 1689–1701
- Thomas May (MP for Canterbury) (c. 1701–1781), MP for Canterbury, 1734–1741

== Sports ==
- Thomas May (cricketer), English cricketer in the 1760s and 1770s
- Tom May (rugby union) (born 1979), rugby union player

== Others ==
- Tom May (mycologist), mycologist
- Thomas May (1595–1650), English poet and dramatist
- Thomas Erskine May (1815–1886), English political scientist
- Thomas May (archaeologist) (1842–1931), English archaeologist
