= Listed buildings in Sheffield S35 =

The S35 district lies within the City of Sheffield, South Yorkshire, England. The district contains 70 listed buildings that are recorded in the National Heritage List for England. Of these, one is listed at Grade I, the highest of the three grades, four are at Grade II*, the middle grade, and the others are at Grade II, the lowest grade. The district is in the north east of the city of Sheffield, and covers the areas of Brightholmlee, Burncross, Chapeltown, Ecclesfield, Grenoside, High Green, Onesacre, Oughtibridge, Wharncliffe Side, Whitley and Worrall, plus part of Middlewood.

For neighbouring areas, see listed buildings in S5, listed buildings in S6, listed buildings in Rotherham (Keppel Ward), listed buildings in Stocksbridge, listed buildings in Tankersley, listed buildings in Wentworth, and listed buildings in Wortley.

== Key ==
Grade	Criteria
I	Buildings of exceptional interest, sometimes considered to be internationally important
II*	Particularly important buildings of more than special interest
II	Buildings of national importance and special interest

== Buildings ==
Name and location	Street	Photograph	Date	Notes	Grade
St Mary, Ecclesfield; 53.44358°N 1.46999°W	Church Street		About 1200		I
Ecclesfield Priory; 53.44396°N 1.47071°W	Priory Road		About 1300		II*
Cruck Barn at 35 St Mary's Road; 53.44188°N 1.46846°W	St Mary's Road		Mediaeval		II
Oughtibridge Hall; 53.43599°N 1.53044°W	Oughtibridge Lane		14th century		II
Housley Hall; 53.46394°N 1.47517°W	Housley Hall Lane		15th century		II
Barnes Hall Farm West and North Barns; 53.45778°N 1.49260°W	Bracken Hill		16th century		II
Whitley Hall Hotel; 53.44962°N 1.48190°W	Elliot Lane		16th century		II*
Onesacre Hall; 53.43687°N 1.55393°W	Green Lane		About 1640		II*
Court House; 53.44237°N 1.47061°W	Town End Road		17th century		II
Fair Hurst Farmhouse Barn; 53.45673°N 1.58232°W	Carr House Lane		17th century		II
Fox House; 53.42490°N 1.54157°W	Top Road		17th century		II
High Lea Cottage and Farmhouse; 53.45164°N 1.56381°W	Brightholmlee Lane		17th century		II
Old Hall Farmhouse; 53.45190°N 1.56361°W	Brightholmlee Lane		17th century		II*
Old Thorn House Farm Barn; 53.45353°N 1.57144°W	Thorn House Lane		17th century		II
Onesacre Hall Barn; 53.43661°N 1.55446°W	Green Lane		17th century		II
Oughtibridge Hall Cowhouse; 53.43570°N 1.53037°W	Oughtibridge Lane		17th century		II
Raynor House Barn; 53.45665°N 1.58806°W	Raynor Lane		17th century		II
Rocher Farmhouse; 53.45570°N 1.59298°W	New Road		1667		II
Rural Cottage; 53.43630°N 1.55285°W	Jackey Lane		Late 17th century		II
Swinnock Hall; 53.44780°N 1.56238°W	Swinnock Lane		17th century		II
Sylvesters Farmhouse; 53.44728°N 1.48542°W	Whitley Lane		Late 17th century		II
66 Towngate Road; 53.42554°N 1.54129°W	Towngate Road		Late 17th century		II
Burton House Farmhouse; 53.43130°N 1.54801°W	Burton Lane		1685		II
64 Towngate Road; 53.42540°N 1.54117°W	Towngate Road		1687		II
Cowley Manor; 53.45663°N 1.45835°W	Cowley Lane		Early 18th century		II
Greenhead House; 53.46216°N 1.47037°W	Burncross Road		Early 18th century		II
Glen Howe Packhorse Bridge; 53.44494°N 1.56154°W	Glen Howe Park		1734		II
Barnes Hall Dovecote; 53.45739°N 1.49263°W	Bracken Hill		1740		II
Cowley Manor Farm Barn; 53.45635°N 1.45858°W	Cowley Lane		18th century		II
Old Hall Farmhouse Barns and Outbuildings; 53.45172°N 1.56346°W	Brightholmlee Lane		18th century		II
Whitley Farmhouse; 53.44702°N 1.48493°W	Whitley Lane		Mid 18th century		II
Low Fold Farmhouse and Barn; 53.43633°N 1.55312°W	Jackey Lane		Late 18th century		II
269 Wheel Lane; 53.44126°N 1.48177°W	Wheel Lane		Late 18th century		II
Oughtibridge Forge; 53.43841°N 1.53703°W	Forge Lane		1792		II
Crucible Furnace Cellar; 53.44199°N 1.50692°W	Top Side		About 1797		II
Middlewood Hall; 53.42680°N 1.53089°W	Mowson Lane		1813		II
Barnes Hall Farm Cartshed; 53.45791°N 1.49275°W	Bracken Hill		About 1820		II
Barnes Hall; 53.45660°N 1.49285°W	Bracken Hill		Early 19th century		II
8 and 10 Church Street; 53.44251°N 1.47015°W	Church Street		Early 19th century		II
Filemakers' Manufactory; 53.44173°N 1.46784°W	High Street		Early 19th century		II
Green Lane Farm Cartshed; 53.45168°N 1.48924°W	Penistone Road		1825		II
Middlewood Hall Coachhouse and Stables; 53.42703°N 1.53122°W	Mowson Lane		Early 19th century		II
Middlewood Hall Gatepiers; 53.42836°N 1.52810°W	Middlewood Road North		Early 19th century		II
Middlewood Hall Railings, Steps and Wall; 53.42668°N 1.53038°W	Mowson Lane		Early 19th century		II
Milepost; 53.46393°N 1.46504°W	Station Road		Early 19th century	South of junction with Commerce Road	II
Milepost; 53.43774°N 1.49463°W	Penistone Road		Early 19th century	North of Wheel Lane	II
Old School Room; 53.44266°N 1.49869°W	School Lane		Early 19th century		II
Windmill Hill Farmhouses; 53.45541°N 1.48020°W	Windmill Hill Lane		Early 18th century		II
Freeman Hospital; 53.46225°N 1.47146°W	Burncross Road		1837		II
The Old School; 53.46515°N 1.47031°W	Loundside		1844		II
Guide Pillar; 53.43938°N 1.54487°W	Cockshutts Lane		19th century	At junction with Long Lane	II
Guide Pillar; 53.42455°N 1.56738°W	Kirk Edge Road		19th century	At junction with Burnt Hill Lane	II
Guide Pillar; 53.44067°N 1.58487°W	Onesmoor Road		19th century	At junction with Brightholmlee Road	II
Guide Pillar; 53.43759°N 1.57819°W	Onesmoor Road		19th century	At junction with Lumb Lane	II
Milepost; 53.46186°N 1.47997°W	Burncross Road		19th century	At junction with Burncross Drive	II
Milepost; 53.45726°N 1.45953°W	Cowley Lane		19th century	Opposite number 182	II
Milepost; 53.46352°N 1.50318°W	Hallwood Road		19th century	East of junction with Penistone Road	II
Milepost; 53.44318°N 1.54858°W	Main Road		19th century	At junction with Langsett Road North	II
Milepost; 53.42279°N 1.52171°W	Middlewood Road North		19th century	North of Stockarth Lane	II
Oughty Bridge railway station 53.43741°N 1.53237°W	Station Lane		1851		II
St John the Baptist, Chapeltown; 53.46491°N 1.47167°W	Housley Park Lane		1859	Designed by Weightman and Hadfield	II
Guide Pillar; 53.45147°N 1.56476°W	Thorn House Lane		1860	At junction with Brightholmlee Lane	II
Chapeltown Methodist Church; 53.46550°N 1.47223°W	Lane End		1866	Designed by James Wilson	II
St Saviour, High Green; 53.47311°N 1.48393°W	Mortomley Lane		1872	Designed by James Brooks	II
Ecclesfield Signal Box; 53.44479°N 1.45441°W	Station Road		Late 19th century		II
Whitley Hall Stableblock; 53.44876°N 1.48519°W	Whitley Carr		Late 19th century		II
Chapeltown War Memorial; 53.46059°N 1.46354°W	Cowley Lane		1919		II
Ecclesfield War Memorial; 53.44317°N 1.46987°W	Church Street		1921	Designed by R. B. Brook-Greaves	II
Grenoside War Memorial; 53.44334°N 1.49563°W	Norfolk Hill		1922		II
Miners Welfare Hall; 53.47294°N 1.48957°W	Grenoview Road		Early 20th century		II
