= Listed buildings in Sheffield S4 =

The S4 district lies within the City of Sheffield, South Yorkshire, England. The district contains 25 listed buildings that are recorded in the National Heritage List for England. Of these, one is listed at Grade II*, the middle grade, and the others are at Grade II, the lowest grade. The district is lies north-east of central Sheffield, and includes the areas of Grimesthorpe, Osgathorpe, Page Hall, Pitsmoor and Victoria Quays.

For neighbouring areas, see listed buildings in Sheffield City Centre, listed buildings in S2, listed buildings in S3, listed buildings in S5 and listed buildings in S9.

== Key ==
Grade	Criteria
II*	Particularly important buildings of more than special interest
II	Buildings of national importance and special interest

== Buildings ==
Name and location	Street	Photograph	Date	Notes	Grade
Cadman Bridge; 53.38724°N 1.45368°W	Cadman Street		1819	Designed by William Chapman	II
Terminal Warehouse; 53.38457°N 1.46053°W	Victoria Quays		1819		II*
Sheaf Works; 53.38616°N 1.45727°W	Maltravers Street		1823		II
Carr Wood House; 53.39958°N 1.45288°W	Grimesthorpe Road		About 1835		II
Grimesthorpe Pump; 53.40691°N 1.43842°W	Upwell Lane		1836		II
Royal Victoria Hotel, Wall and Ramp; 53.38704°N 1.45986°W	Victoria Station Road		1848		II
Abbeyfield House; 53.40044°N 1.46332°W	Abbeyfield Park		About 1850		II
President Works Offices; 53.39496°N 1.44491°W	Savile Street East		About 1852		II
Atlas Works Offices; 53.39439°N 1.44571°W	Savile Street East		1853		II
St Thomas; 53.40667°N 1.43207°W	Holywell Road		1854	Designed by Flockton & Son	II
Arches and Tunnel Entrance; 53.38541°N 1.45799°W	Victoria Quays		1855		II
Sipelia Works; 53.38688°N 1.45488°W	Cadman Street		1855		II
Norfolk Bridge; 53.38971°N 1.44913°W	Leveson Street		1856		II
Merchants Crescent; 53.38486°N 1.46085°W	Victoria Quays		About 1860		II
Don Sawmills; 53.38872°N 1.45912°W	Savile Street		About 1870		II
Grain Warehouse; 53.38479°N 1.46037°W	Victoria Quays		About 1870		II
Firths Norfolk West Gun Shop; 53.39536°N 1.44435°W	Savile Street East		Late 19th century		II
Grimesthorpe School; 53.40568°N 1.43941°W	Earl Marshal Road		1875	Designed by Innocent & Brown	II
Grimesthorpe School Caretaker's House; 53.40607°N 1.43953°W	Earl Marshal Road		1877	Designed by Innocent & Brown	II
Pluto Works; 53.39524°N 1.44349°W	Princess Street		About 1890		II
Straddle Warehouse; 53.38460°N 1.45972°W	Victoria Quays		1898		II
Crucible Steel Works; 53.38779°N 1.45745°W	Effingham Street		About 1900		II
Thomas Firth & Sons Siemens Department Gateway; 53.39363°N 1.44709°W	Savile Street East		About 1900		II
18, 20 and 22 Page Hall Road; 53.40880°N 1.44810°W	Page Hall Road		About 1910		II
Brown-Firth Laboratories; 53.39166°N 1.44618°W	Blackmore Street		Early 20th century		II
