= Roman Rigg =

Roman Rigg is a colloquial name for a number of geographical features, including:

- Roman Rig, a dyke running between Sheffield and Mexborough in South Yorkshire
- Roman Ridge, part of the Roman road of Ermine Street located in the Doncaster area of South Yorkshire
