= Roman Rig =

Coordinates: 53.470°N 1.332°W

Plan of the Roman Ridge

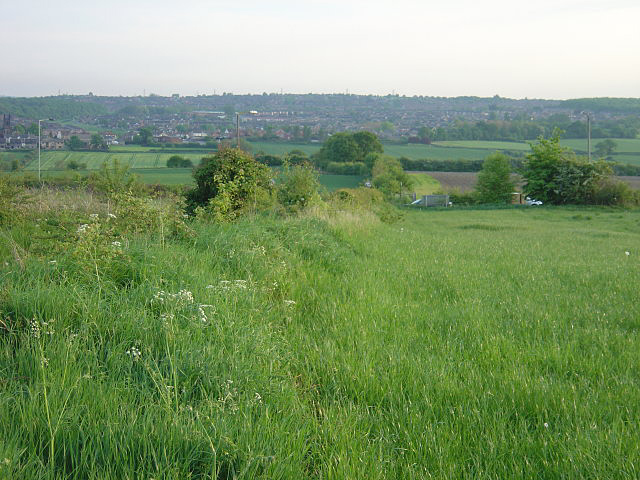
Earthworks near Greasbrough

The Roman Rig (also known as Roman Ridge, Scotland Balk, Barber Balk, Devil's Bank or Danes Bank) is the name given to a series of earthworks in the north of Rotherham, in South Yorkshire, England. They are believed to originally have formed a single dyke running from near Wincobank, in Sheffield to Mexborough. Its purpose and date of construction are unknown. Formerly thought to have been a Roman road, modern archaeologists think that it was built either in the 1st century AD by the Brigantian tribes as a defence against the Roman invasion of Britain or after the 5th century to defend the kingdom of Elmet from the Angles.

The southernmost end of the dyke is thought to have been close to Lady's Bridge at the River Don in Sheffield, but today, it becomes visible only close to the Iron Age fort at Wincobank. The dyke continues in a north-easterly direction following the Don Valley to Kimberworth in Rotherham where it splits into two branches that continue roughly parallel to each other in a sweep starting to the north-east and turning east. The southern branch passes through Greasbrough, intersecting the River Don just south of Swinton at Kilnhurst. The northern branch passes close to another Iron Age fort at Scholes Coppice and runs to the north of Swinton, meeting the River Don at Mexborough.

Part of the western end of the ridge was used in the Middle Ages to demarcate the boundary of Ecclesfield and Sheffield. The western part parallels the Don, and a report of 1891 in the Sheffield Independent stated that it had formerly run as far west as Bridgehouses. Part of the northern branch formed the boundary between Wath-on-Dearne on the one side and Rawmarsh and Swinton on the other.

== See also ==
- Carl Wark
- Templeborough
