= Woodhouse Cemetery, Sheffield =

Cemetery in Sheffield, England

Coordinates: 53.3175°N 1.3517°W

Woodhouse Cemetery
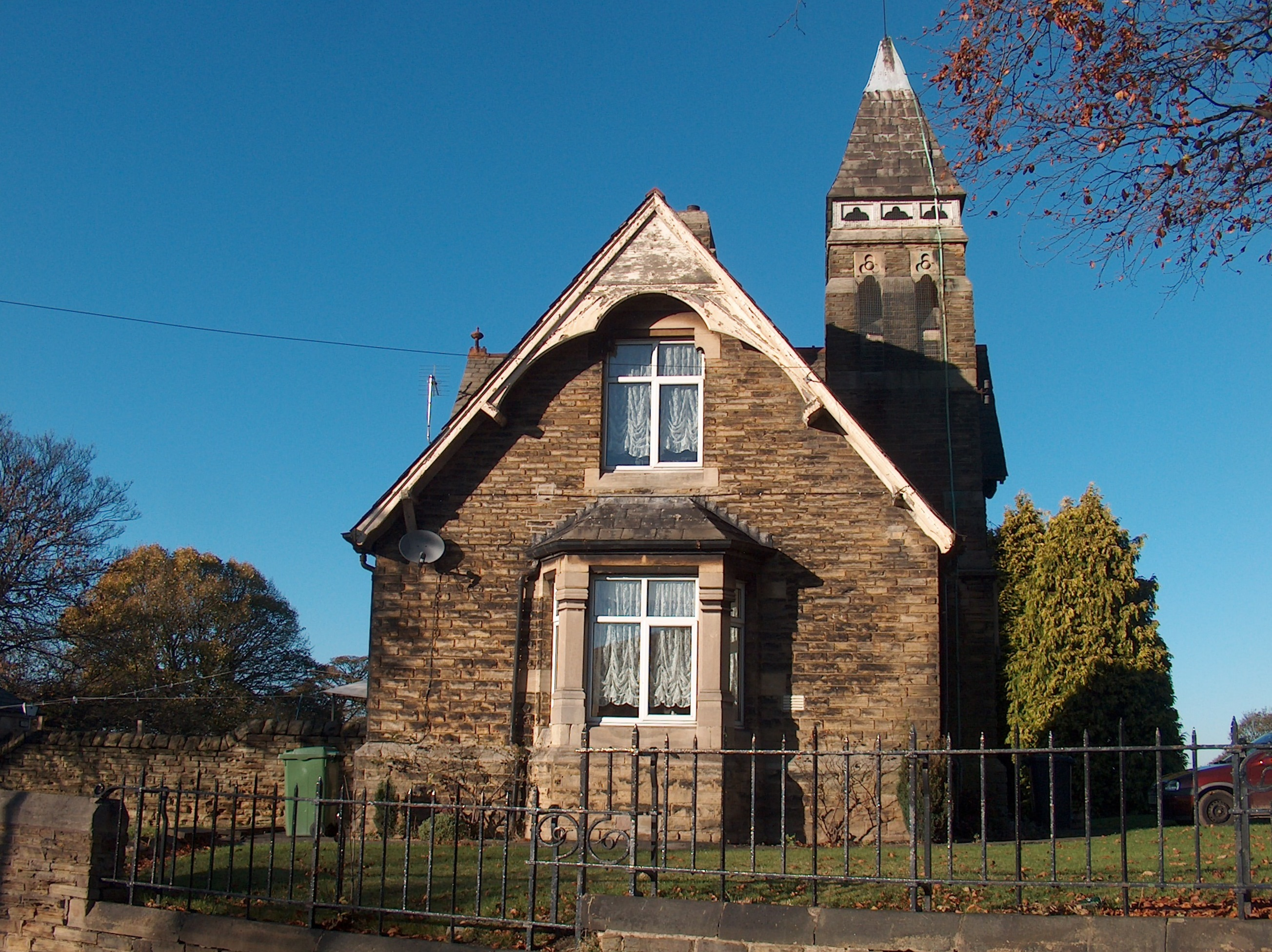
- The Gatehouse
- Interactive map of Woodhouse Cemetery

Details
- Established: 1878
- Location: Stradbroke Road, Woodhouse, Sheffield, South Yorkshire
- Country: United Kingdom
- Type: Anglican cemetery
- Style: Victoria
- Owned by: Sheffield City Council
- Website: Sheffield City Council
- Find a Grave: Woodhouse Cemetery

Woodhouse Cemetery is a cemetery located on Stradbroke Road, Woodhouse, Sheffield.

== History ==
The cemetery and chapel was established in 1878, and was designed by Innocent and Brown. The first burials took place in 1879.

The Woodhouse Cemetery Chapel, the Gateway and Railing, and the Cemetery Lodge are all grade-II listed.

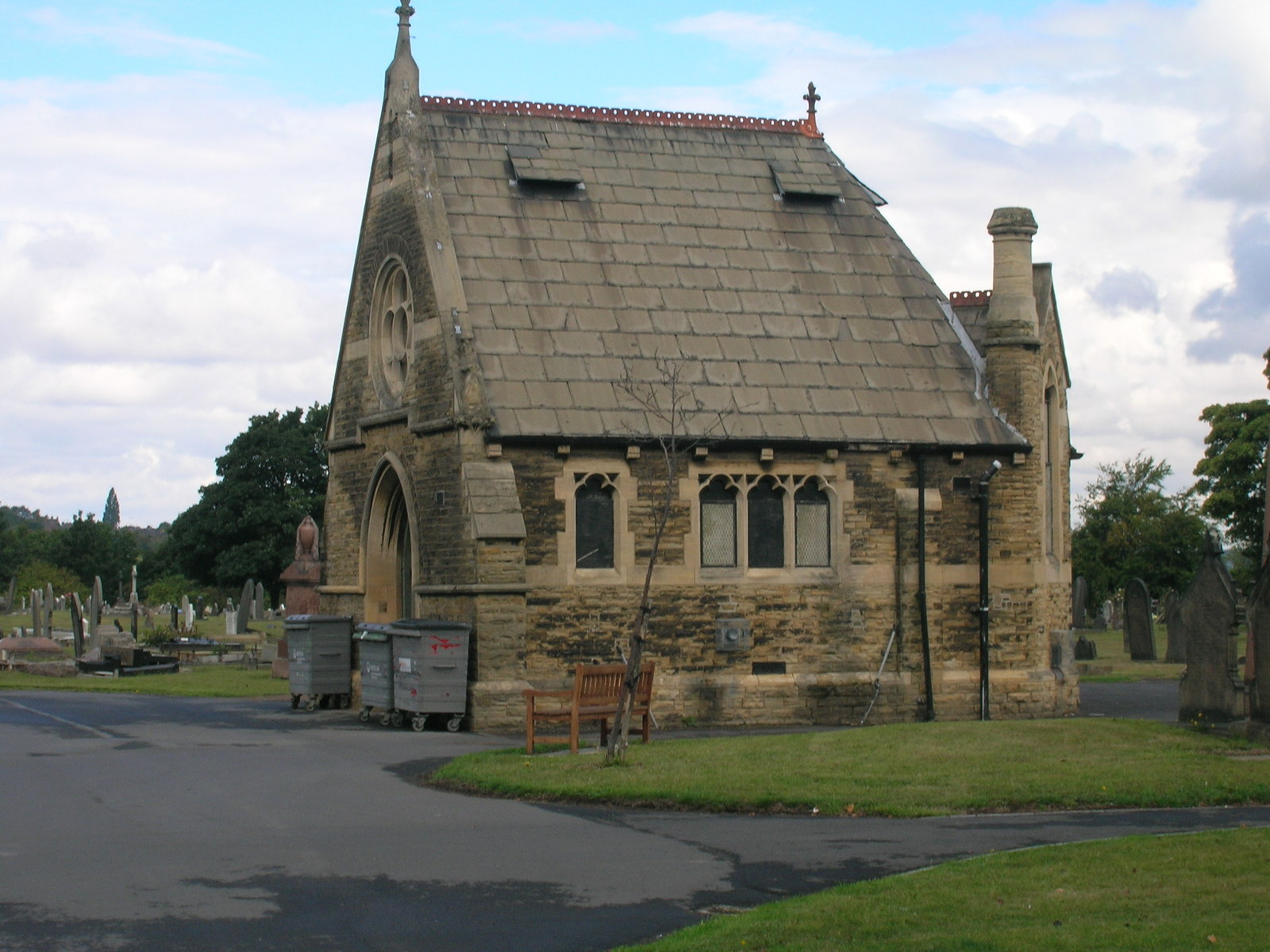
Cemetery Chapel

== See also ==
- Listed buildings in Sheffield S13
