= St Joseph's Church, Handsworth =

Coordinates: 53.3723°N 1.3851°W

St Joseph's Church
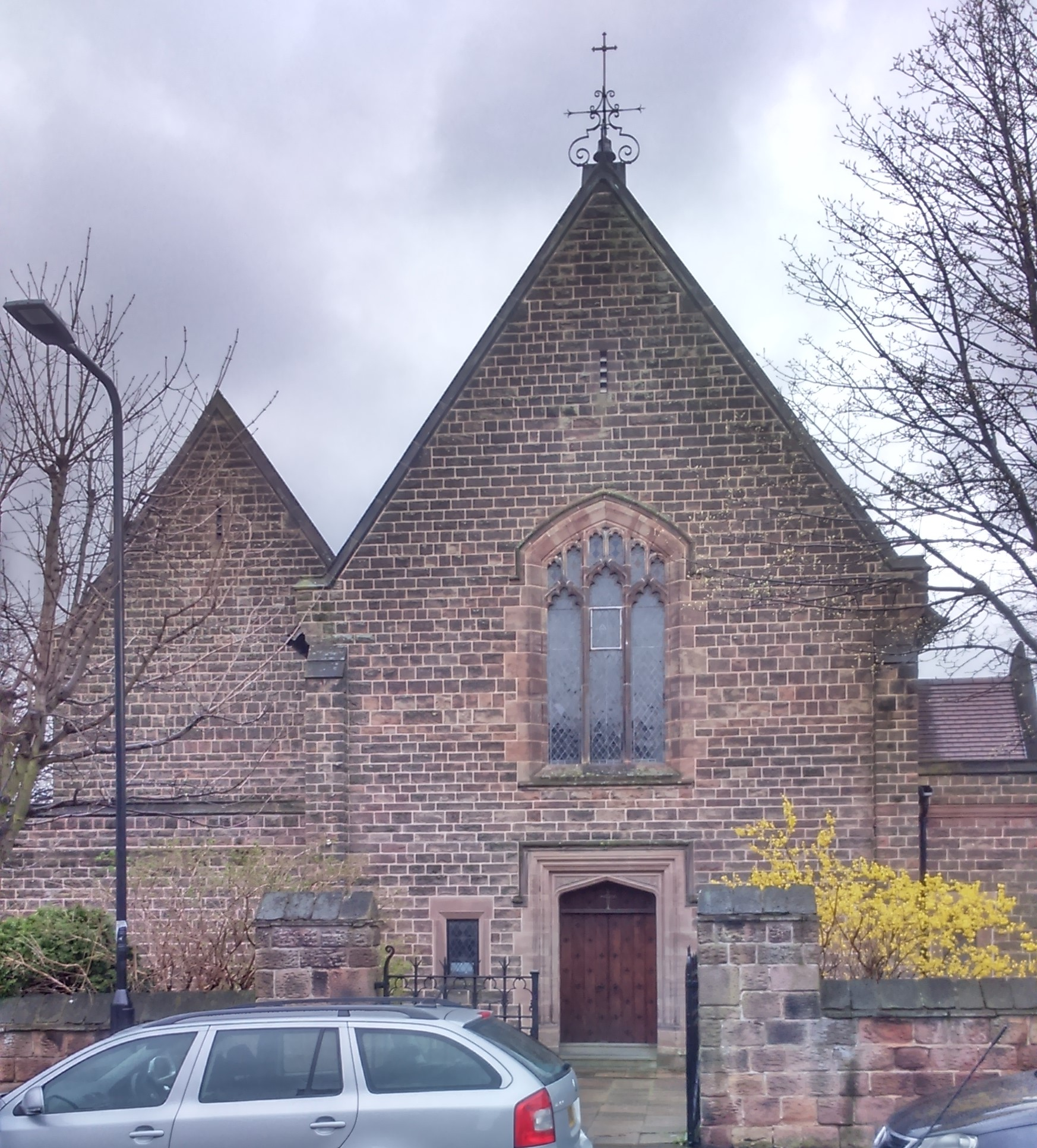
- St Joseph's Church in 2016

- Location in Sheffield
- OS grid reference: SK 41007 86339
- Location: St. Joseph's Road, Handsworth, Sheffield, South Yorkshire
- Country: England
- Denomination: Roman Catholic
- Website: St Joseph, Handsworth

Architecture
- Functional status: Active
- Heritage designation: Grade II
- Designated: 12 December 1995
- Architect: Matthew Ellison Hadfield
- Architectural type: Church
- Style: Gothic Revival
- Groundbreaking: 1879
- Completed: 1881

Administration
- Diocese: Hallam

St Joseph's Church, Handsworth is a Roman Catholic church located in Handsworth, Sheffield, England. The church is an active Roman Catholic church in the diocese of Hallam. It was designed by M. E Hadfield, with the foundation stone being laid in 1879. The church was grade II listed on 12 December 1995.

== History ==
Prior to the church's construction, a mission house stood on Stubbin Lane. Following a meeting between the Duke of Norfolk, and Fr. Adrian van Roosmalen in Europe, the Duke offered to build him a church in England.

The Bishop of Leeds, Robert Cornthwaite laid the foundation stone on 17 August 1879, with the official opening occurring on 7 June 1881.

During the early 20th-century, the church, Fr. Adrian van Roosmalen, Fr. Timothy Moynihan and Fr. Arthur Kay developed the church. Van Roosmalen died in 1924 and was buried in the adjoining churchyard.

== See also ==
- Listed buildings in Sheffield S13
