= Thorpe Hesley =

Village in South Yorkshire, England

Coordinates: 53.45°N 1.44°W

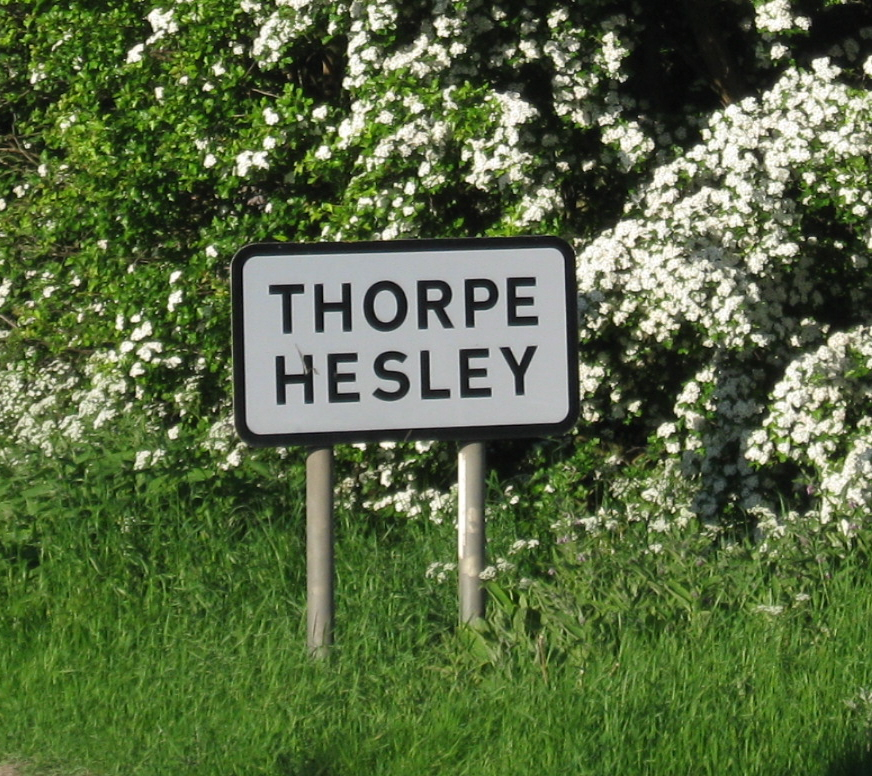
- Entering from Jumble Lane

- Location within South Yorkshire
- Population: 4,439 (2015 est.)
- Metropolitan borough: Rotherham
- Metropolitan county: South Yorkshire
- Region: Yorkshire and the Humber
- Country: England
- Sovereign state: United Kingdom
- Post town: ROTHERHAM
- Postcode district: S61
- Dialling code: 0114
- Police: South Yorkshire
- Fire: South Yorkshire
- Ambulance: Yorkshire
- UK Parliament: Rotherham

Thorpe Hesley is a village in the Metropolitan Borough of Rotherham, South Yorkshire, England, lying east of the M1 motorway at junction 35. The village has been included within the boundaries of Rotherham town since 1894, having previously been divided between the townships of Kimberworth and Wentworth. Historically the village was known for coal mining and nail making. It has an Anglican church, Holy Trinity, built in 1839 chiefly at the cost of Earl Fitzwilliam and the Earl of Effingham.

There is one post office, which is located within a convenience store, one petrol station and four public houses. At the 2021 Census, it had a population of 4,150.

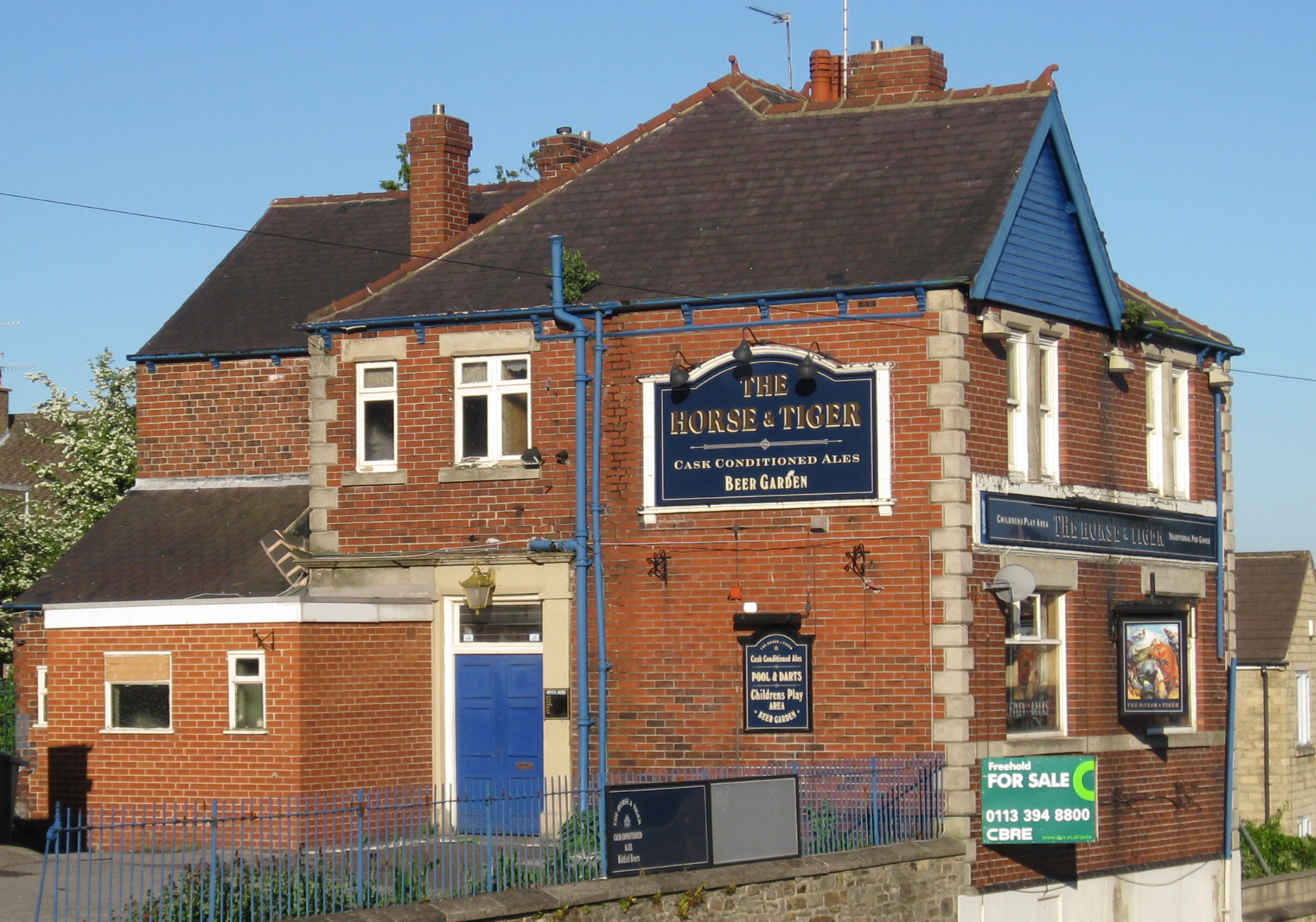
Horse and Tiger pub, Brook Hill

== In popular culture ==
John Wesley spent some time in the village where he preached. He lodged at Barley Hall (now demolished).

In 1975, there was filming in the village for the Walt Disney film Escape from the Dark. The film was re-titled The Littlest Horse Thieves for its release in the United States.

The BBC TV Series Play for Today had a two part story titled The Price of Coal filmed at the colliery on Wentworth Road; this mine has now been closed and the colliery demolished.

== Economy ==
A M1 service area was proposed at junction 35, but the local council said the green belt must remain, in March 1995. The service area was proposed again in 1997, and again in 1999.

=== Coal mines ===
Coal has been mined in and around the area of Thorpe Hesley for at least 800 years. Monks from the Cistercian Abbey of Kirkstead, in Lincolnshire, had forges and other property in this part of the country and mined coal and ironstone locally. Thorpe Hesley had the distinction of having three modern-day coal mines. Which were closed in the 1970s and 1980s and have been completely demolished. The land surrounding the area of the Barley Hall site has been landscaped and is now a small nature reserve.

In January 2013 permission was given for the Hesley Wood colliery spoil heap to be processed to recover fuel, and to restore woodland on the site.

== See also ==
- Listed buildings in Rotherham (Keppel Ward)
