= Brinsworth =

Village and civil parish in South Yorkshire, England

Coordinates: 53.4042°N 1.3767°W

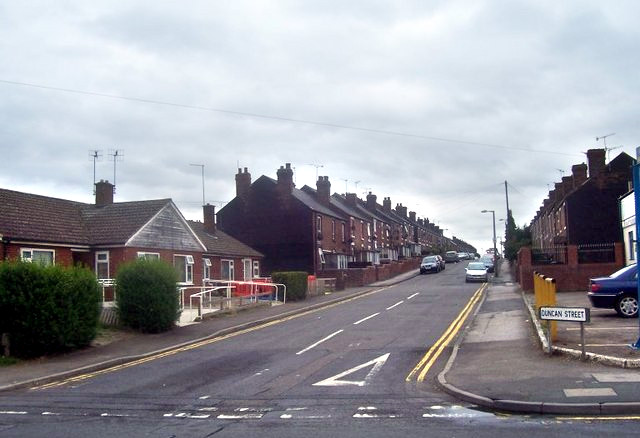
- Duncan Street

- Location within South Yorkshire
- Population: 9,527 (2021)
- OS grid reference: SK425897
  - London: 138 mi (222 km) SSE
- Civil parish: Brinsworth
- Metropolitan borough: Rotherham
- Metropolitan county: South Yorkshire
- Region: Yorkshire and the Humber
- Country: England
- Sovereign state: United Kingdom
- Post town: ROTHERHAM
- Postcode district: S60
- Dialling code: 01709
- Police: South Yorkshire
- Fire: South Yorkshire
- Ambulance: Yorkshire
- UK Parliament: Rotherham

Brinsworth is a village and civil parish in the Metropolitan Borough of Rotherham, in South Yorkshire, England. It is situated close to the River Rother between Rotherham (to the north-east) and Sheffield (to the south-west). At the time of the 2001 census it had a population of 8,950, reducing to 8,789 at the 2011 Census.

Brinsworth became a new separate ward in May 2021 which covers the whole village beyond the parish boundary. This change was to accommodate an expanding neighbouring ward of Rother Vale - that includes the new mainly private housing estate of Waverley which has around 3,800 homes with its own school and lake frontage.

== History ==
Brinsworth is located about 1 mile (1.6 km) south of the site of a Roman fort at Templeborough. Remains thought to be part of the Roman road called Icknield Street, which passed the fort, were discovered on White Hill in 1948, between Brinsworth and Canklow. Other Roman remains found on White Hill by a team led by Dorothy Greene, Keeper of Roman Antiquities at Rotherham's Clifton Park Museum, included nine roads in a grid 926 ft by 490 ft at grid reference SK420905. In addition, walls of buildings were traced including what may have been a temple platform, and pottery dating from the late 2nd and 3rd centuries was found.

This area has been suggested by historian Michael Wood as one of the possible locations for the Battle of Brunanburh, which took place in 937, although he also strongly believes it to be near Burghwallis, outside of Doncaster. The earliest known written reference to Brinsworth appears in the 1086 Domesday Book, where it is referred to as "Brynesford", a name thought to mean 'Bryni's ford'. At this time the land was mostly 'waste', having been decimated in the 'Harrying of the North' that took place following the Norman conquest, and it was divided between Roger de Busli and William de Percy.

The village grew in the 19th century as coal mines were sunk in the surrounding area, and by 1891 the population was 1,656. New housing estates were built around Brinsworth in the 1950s, increasing the population to its current level.

== Notable buildings ==
Brinsworth has three primary schools: Brinsworth Howarth, situated next to Catcliffe on Whitehill Lane; Brinsworth Whitehill, at the very highest point of Brinsworth at its centre; and Brinsworth Manor, the largest, located in the middle of the old village. The village secondary school is Brinsworth Academy.

The Church of England parish church is St Andrew and is joined with St Mary at Catcliffe.

== See also ==
- Listed buildings in Brinsworth
