= Listed buildings in Sheffield S13 =

The S13 district lies within the City of Sheffield, South Yorkshire, England. The district contains 22 listed buildings that are recorded in the National Heritage List for England. All the listed buildings are designated at Grade II, the lowest of the three grades, which is applied to "buildings of national importance and special interest". The district is in the east of the city of Sheffield, and covers the Handsworth, Richmond and Woodhouse areas of the city.

For neighbouring areas, see listed buildings in S2, listed buildings in S9, listed buildings in S12, listed buildings in S20, and listed buildings in Aston cum Aughton.

== Buildings ==
Name and location	Street	Photograph	Date	Notes
St Mary, Handsworth; 53.37111°N 1.38450°W	Handsworth Road		Late 12th century	
Woodhouse Village Cross; 53.35852°N 1.37000°W	Market Place		14th century	
Old Rectory; 53.37100°N 1.38378°W	Handsworth Road		Mid-17th century	
Cross Daggers; 53.35837°N 1.36977°W	Market Place		1658	
Manor Farmhouse; 53.35883°N 1.37103°W	Cross Drive		1690	
304–330 Richmond Road Gate Piers; 53.36510°N 1.40168°W	Richmond Road		About 1700	Former entrance to Gray's Farm
Bramley Hall; 53.36788°N 1.38755°W	Bramley Hall Road		Early-18th century	
Woodhouse Village Stocks; 53.35859°N 1.36998°W	Market Place		Late-18th century	
53 Beighton Road; 53.35734°N 1.36268°W	Beighton Road		About 1830	
53 Beighton Road Wall and Gateposts; 53.35721°N 1.36297°W	Beighton Road		About 1830	
St Mary, Handsworth Walls, Piers and War Memorial; 53.37105°N 1.38501°W	Handsworth Road		Late 19th century	
Trinity Methodist Church; 53.35890°N 1.37340°W	Chapel Street		1878	
Trinity Methodist Church Gateway and Railing; 53.35878°N 1.37345°W	Chapel Street		1878	
Woodhouse Cemetery Chapel; 53.35953°N 1.37790°W	Stradbroke Road		1878	Designed by Innocent & Brown
Woodhouse Cemetery Gateway and Railing; 53.35909°N 1.37794°W	Stradbroke Road		1878	Designed by Innocent & Brown
Woodhouse Cemetery Lodge; 53.35920°N 1.37818°W	Stradbroke Road		1878	Designed by Innocent & Brown
St Joseph, Handsworth and Presbytery; 53.37233°N 1.38513°W	St Joseph's Road		1881	Designed by M. E. Hadfield & Son
St Joseph's School; 53.37194°N 1.38555°W	St Joseph's Road		1881	Designed by M. E. Hadfield & Son
Water Pump and Trough; 53.37216°N 1.38495°W	St Joseph's Road		1881	South of Presbytery
Jeffcock Memorial Fountain and Trough; 53.37123°N 1.38746°W	Handsworth Road		1900	
Woodhouse Mill War Memorial; 53.36619°N 1.35320°W	Retford Road		1922	
St Catherine of Siena; 53.36144°N 1.40752°W	Handsworth Road		1959	Designed by Basil Spence
