= Concord Park =

Park in Sheffield, England

Coordinates: 53.428°N 1.431°W

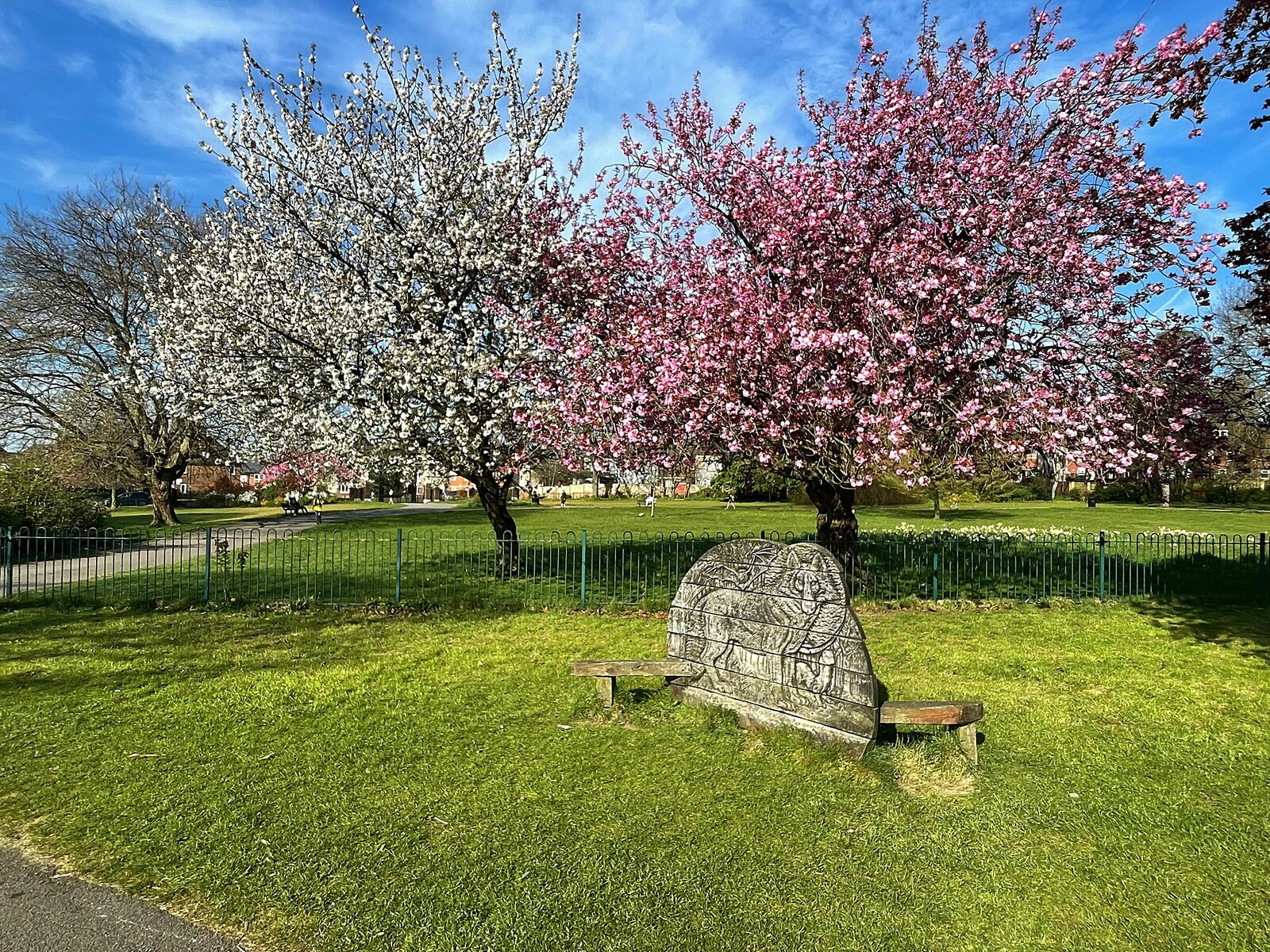
Concord Park

Concord Park is a large park in the North of Sheffield, England, between Shiregreen and Wincobank.

The park consists of Concord Park Golf Course, a country park and Woolley Woods, bordered by Ecclesfield Road.

A Grade II listed cruck barn lies at the entrance to the park, the last remnant of the mediaeval hamlet of Oaksfold.
