= Wincobank (hill fort) =

Hillfort in South Yorkshire, England

Coordinates: 53.414645°N 1.43198°W

Wincobank shown in Sheffield

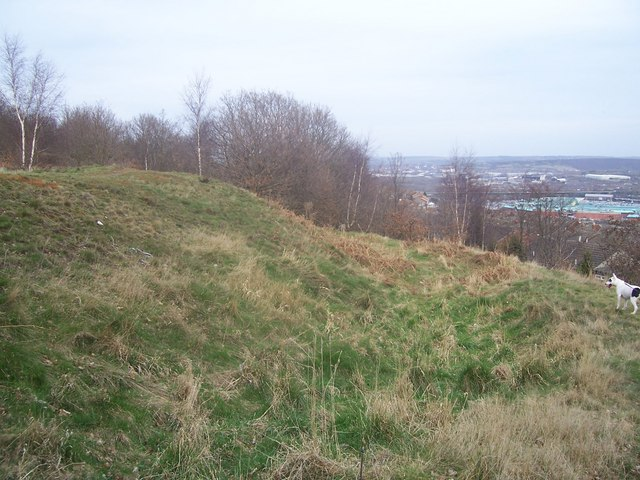
Site of Wincobank fort

Wincobank (grid reference SK377910) is an Iron Age hill fort near Wincobank in Sheffield, England.

== Location ==
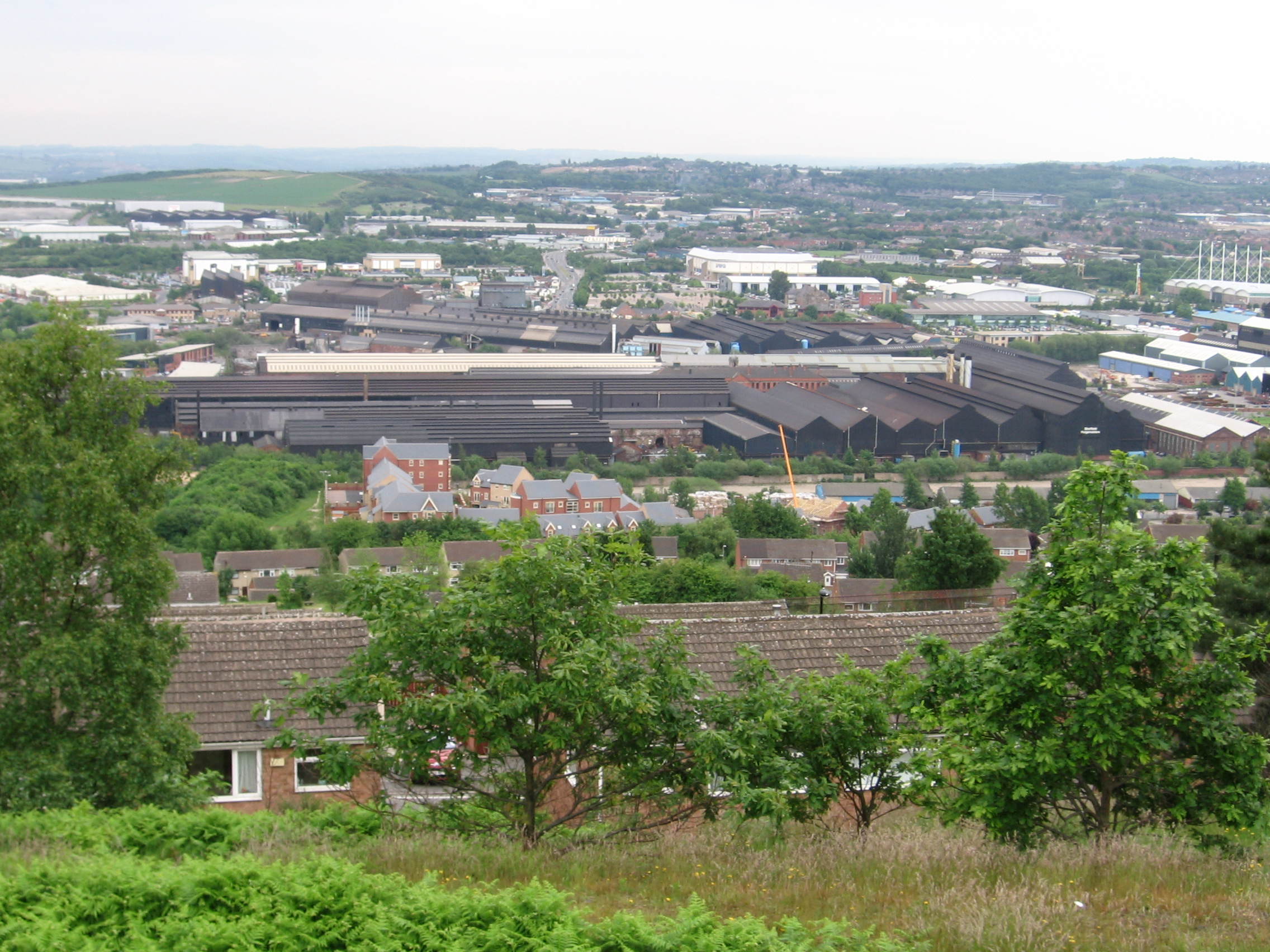
A view of the Don Valley from Wincobank

The fort stands on an isolated sandstone hill that forms the northern side of the river valley of the River Don.

== Description ==
The fort site is an oval-shaped earthwork that covers about 1 ha (2.5 acres). A ditch, which was originally between 1.5 m (4 ft 11 in) and 2 m (6 ft 7 in), surround the entire the fort. A counterscarp consisting of a rubble core was created from material excavated when digging the ditch. The outward side of the earthen rampart was reinforced with stone facings held together with timbers. These timbers show signs of being vitrified, the charring indicates they were subjected to intense heat (ie burning). Maybe as a result of inter-tribal conflict in the late Iron Age. Material taken from a drainage ditch dug through the north east rampart of the fort in 1979 was radiocarbon dated to c. 500 BC.

Breaks in the rampart on the north-east and south-west sides were once considered to be the fort's original entrances; this conclusion is now considered incorrect. The real entrance is on the south-east ramparts where the bank turn inwards slightly at this point. A mound set close to the rampart is thought to be the site of a watch tower.

== Human occupation ==
Early antiquarians thought the Romans built the fort. Archaeologists now think it was constructed by the Celtic Brigantes tribe. Some historians suggest that this fort was part of a 1st-century defensive line built by the Brigantes attempting to halt the northward expansion by the Romans. This defensive line is suggested to have included hill forts at Carl Wark and Scholes Coppice, and an ancient dyke called Roman Rig that runs from the fort northeast to Mexborough.

The hill was first recorded in 1442 as Wincowe and appears to be derived from Wineca, an Anglo-Saxon personal name and the Old Norse word haugr meaning a mound or hill and so meaning Wineca’s hill.

During the defence of Sheffield in the Second World War, an anti-aircraft gun and searchlight emplacement was built adjacent to the south-west corner of the fort.
