= Listed buildings in Brinsworth =

Brinsworth is a civil parish in the Metropolitan Borough of Rotherham, South Yorkshire, England. The parish contains two listed buildings that are recorded in the National Heritage List for England. Both the listed buildings are designated at Grade II, the lowest of the three grades, which is applied to "buildings of national importance and special interest". The parish contains the village of Brinsworth, and the listed buildings consist of a milepost and a war memorial.

== Buildings ==
Name and location	Photograph	Date	Notes
Milepost; 53.40843°N 1.37919°W		Later part, 19th century	The milepost is on the north side of Bawtry Road (A631 road). It consists of a gritstone post with cast iron overlay, and has a triangular plan and a rounded top. On the top is inscribed "BAWTRY & TINSLEY ROAD" and "BRINSWORTH", and on the sides are the distances to Barnby Moor, Bawtry, Tickhill, Sheffield and Tinsley.
Brinsworth and Canklow War Memorial; 53.40779°N 1.36755°W	—	1923	The war memorial is in the churchyard of St George's Church and is in stone. It consists of a Latin cross on a square shaft with a moulded base, on a rectangular plinth and two steps. On the front of the cross is knotwork decoration, on the shaft is an inscription, and on the plinth are the names of those lost in the First World War. Later plaques have been added, including one containing the names of those lost in the Second World War. The memorial is on a platform and is enclosed by posts and a chain link fence.
