= Tinsley Park Cemetery =

Cemetery in Sheffield, England

Coordinates: 53.393°N 1.405°W

Tinsley Park Cemetery is one of the city of Sheffield's many cemeteries. It was opened in 1882, and covers 19 acres (77,000 m^{2}). The cemetery is still open to burials, and since the first burial on 2 June 1882 over 59,000 burials have taken place. There are buried in the cemetery 42 Commonwealth service personnel from the First World War and 32 from the Second World War.

The entranceway to the cemetery is flanked by a pair of Grade II listed Gothic style chapels, where services can be held prior to the burial. Other listed structures in the cemetery include the lodge, gateway and boundary wall and a war memorial, 820 feet (250 m) east of the chapel.

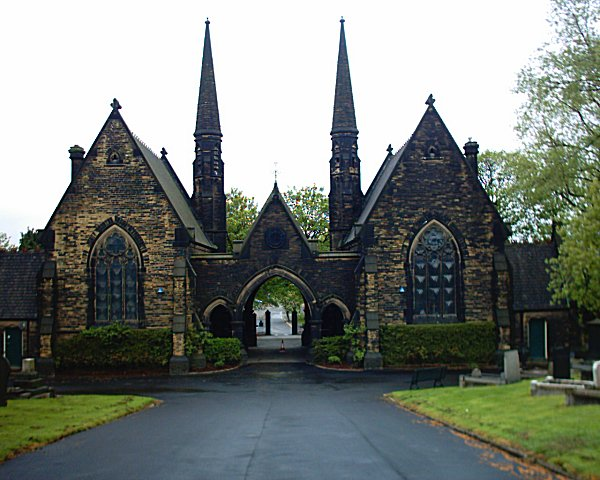
The cemetery's gothic chapel

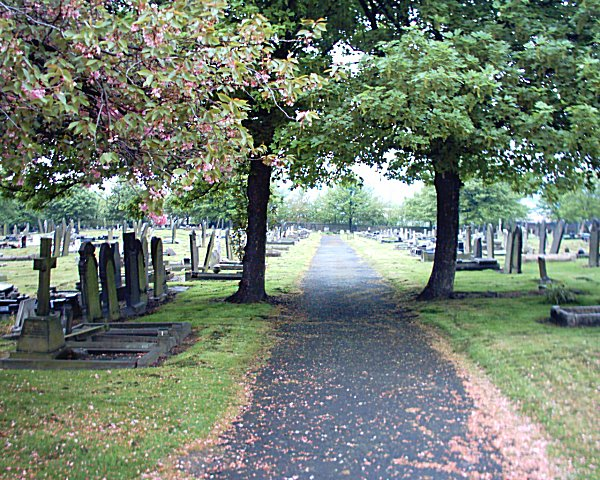
The cemetery
