= Victoria Quays =

Canal basin in Sheffield, England

Coordinates: 53.384711°N 1.45917°W

Victoria Quays (formerly Sheffield Canal Basin) is a large canal basin in Sheffield, England. It was constructed 1816–1819 as the terminus of the Sheffield Canal (now part of the Sheffield and South Yorkshire Navigation) and includes the former coal yards of the Manchester, Sheffield and Lincolnshire Railway.

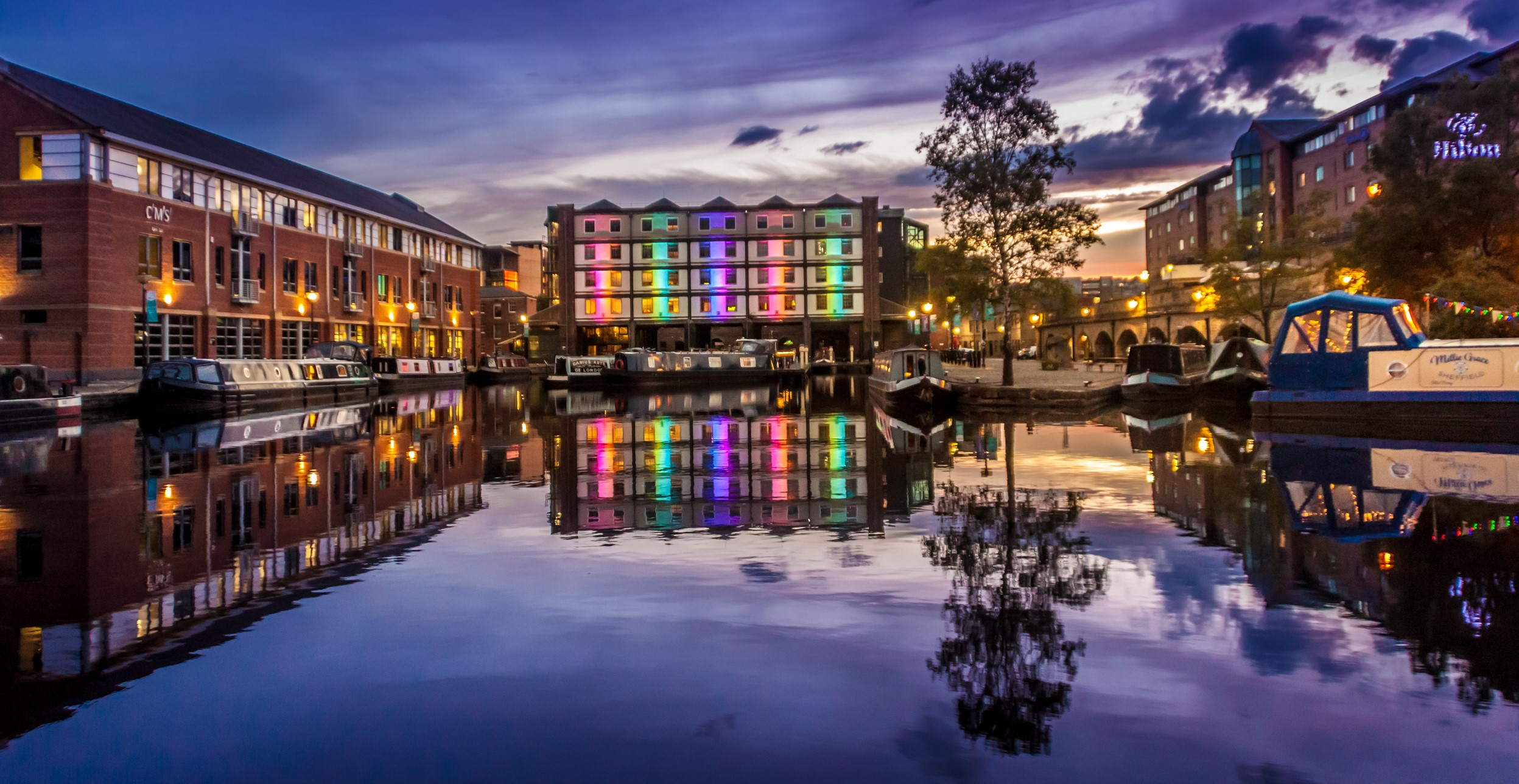
Victoria Quays at dusk

The basin ceased operation as a cargo port in 1970 and the site and buildings were largely neglected. A restoration and redevelopment of 1992–1994 reopened the site providing new office and business space and leisure facilities as well as berths for leisure canal boats. There are a number of Grade II listed buildings on the site. These include the original Terminal Warehouse of 1819, the Straddle Warehouse (1895–1898), a grain warehouse (c. 1860), and a curved terrace of coal merchant's offices (c. 1870).

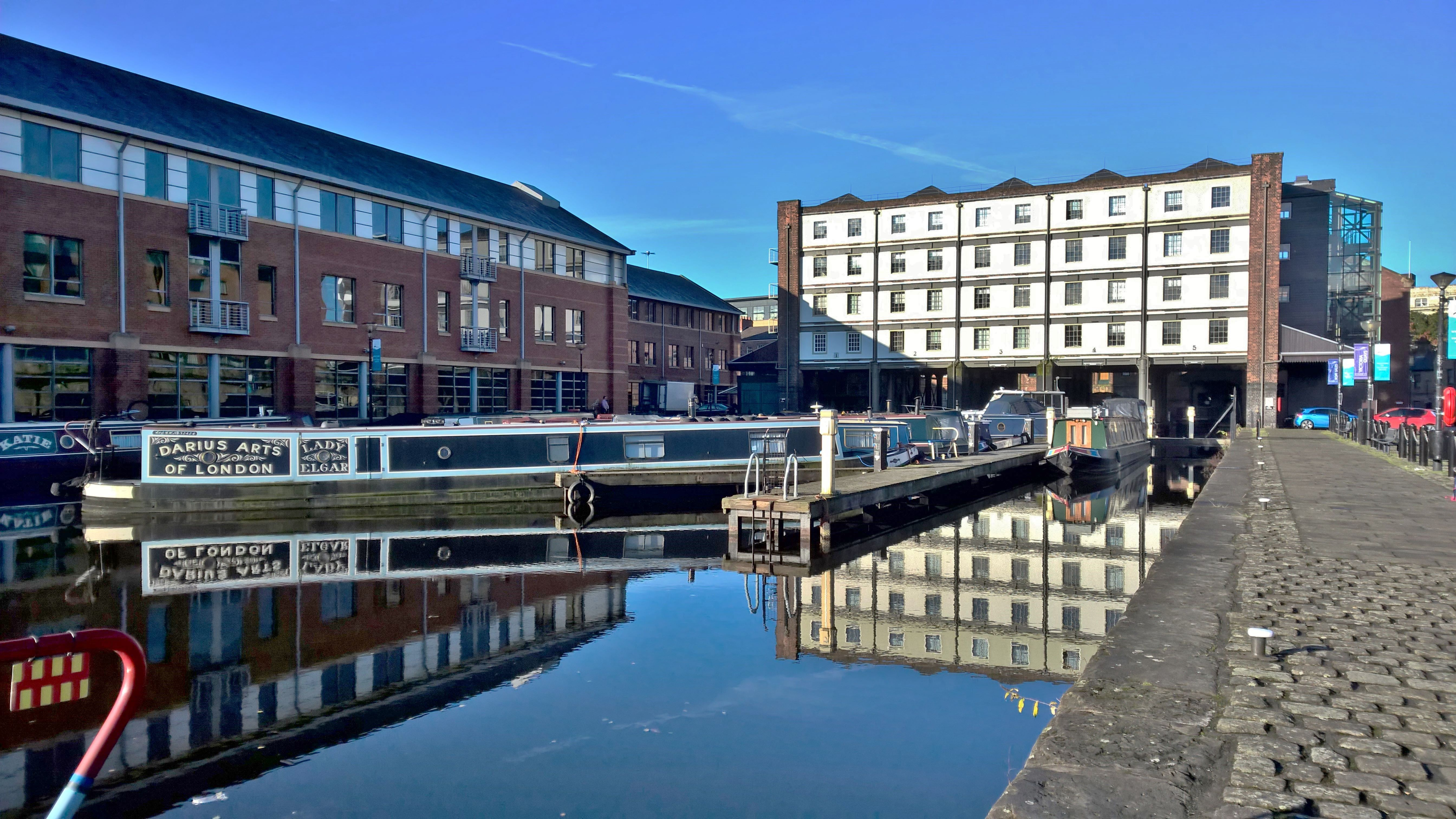
Victoria Quays

== Local businesses ==
Victoria Quays shown in Sheffield

There is Victoria Junction Café and sandwich shop, Livingwell gym, Hilton hotel, Narrowboat moorings, a brokerage and chandlery service (C.V. Marine) & two wide beam hotel boats (Houseboathotels, Sheffield) providing hotel accommodation on the water. Newcomers include Born & Raise who joined the premises in 2015 as a Marketing Agency and most recently Ovo Spaces an award-winning specialist interior design and fit-out company, who now own both Terminal 1 for their offices and Terminal 2 as an event space available to hire.

In early 2015 Sheffield Creative Agency 'We Are' purchased 3,500 sq ft of office space on the ground floor of the Grade II-listed Grain and Terminal Building which had been vacant for 20 years

In 2017, The Dorothy Pax opened its doors as a bar & live music venue, often described as a hidden gem. The bar itself is made from the timbers of the last Sheffield Keele with the same name which was built in 1860 in Mexborough. In October 2020 Arts Council England deemed The Pax to be culturally significant and still programmes a varied mix of music a few times a week, as well as their annual Canal-Lines musical event and Shady Grove Festival.

== See also ==
- Listed buildings in Sheffield
