= Thomas May (archaeologist) =

English archaeologist (1842–1931)

Thomas May FSA (1 October 1842 – 28 October 1931) was an English archaeologist who was notable for his study of pottery from Roman Britain.

== Life ==
Thomas May was born in Cambridge in 1842 and went to Edinburgh University. He worked for the Inland Revenue until his retirement and afterwards devoted his time to archaeology.

He catalogued the pottery from the Roman sites at Silchester and Colchester. He also contributed to the reports of excavations at Wroxeter, Hengistbury Head, Richborough, Swarling and the Roman cemetery at Ospringe.

May excavated the Roman industrial site at Wilderspool between 1898 and 1905. He also excavated the Roman fort at Templeborough in 1916 before it was destroyed by the construction of a steel works. He moved to Stratford-upon-Avon when Roman remains were discovered at Tiddington and excavated the site.

He died at Loxley Lodge, Stratford-upon-Avon.

== Honours and awards ==
Thomas May was elected a fellow of the Society of Antiquaries of London in 1916.

== Select Bibliography ==
May, Thomas F.S.A. (1904). Warrington's Roman remains : the Roman fortifications, potter's kilns, iron and glass furnaces, and bronze founders' and enamellers' workshop discovered at Wilderspool and Stockton Heath, near Warrington. Warrington: Mackie.

May, Thomas F.S.A. (1916). The pottery found at Silchester : a descriptive account of the pottery recovered during the excavations on the site of the Romano-British city of Calleva Atrebatum at Silchester, Hants., and deposited in the Reading Museum. Reading: E. Poynder.

May, Thomas (archaeologist) (1922). The Roman forts of Templebrough near Rotherham. Rotherham: H. Garnett and Co.
