= Darnall Works =

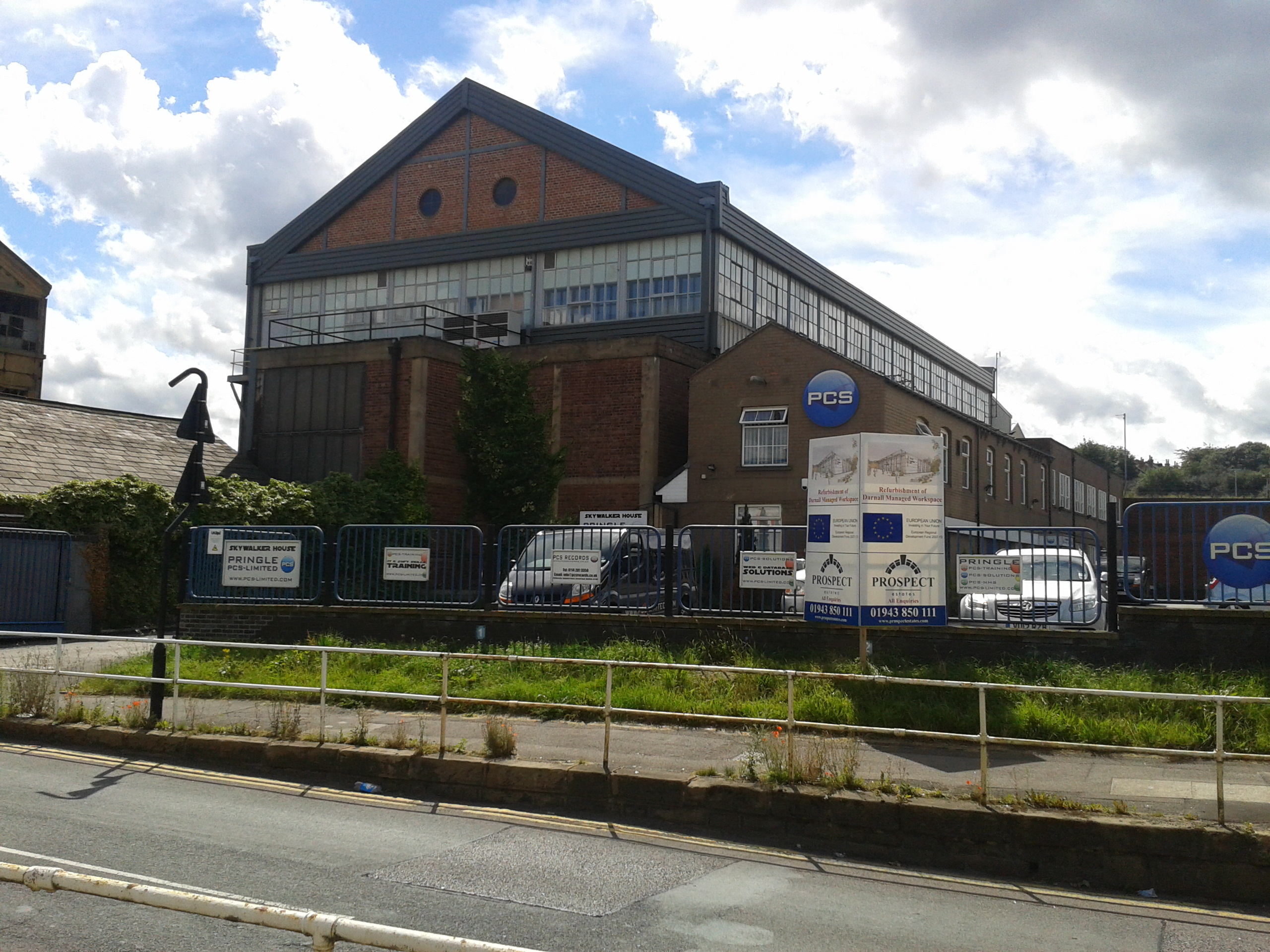
- Former Heat Treatment Workshop at Darnall Works

- Location within Sheffield
- Former names: Don Glass Works; Darnall Steel Works; Kayser Ellison Works; Sanderson Kayser Works

General information
- Type: Steelworks
- Location: Darnall Road, Darnall, Sheffield, United Kingdom
- Coordinates: 53.391°N 1.423°W
- Opened: 1790s, 1835, 1871–1872, 1913
- Renovated: 2010

Technical details
- Structural system: Brick, some buildings with steel frames

Other information
- Public transit access: Y TT Attercliffe

The Darnall Works is a former steelworks in the Darnall area of Sheffield in England. The only remaining large complex of crucible furnaces, the works opened in the 1835 and were frequently extended and adapted until the late 20th century. Some of the structures at the works are listed buildings, at Grade II* and Grade II, and part of the site is a Scheduled Ancient Monument.

== Establishment ==
Naylor and Sanderson was established in 1776 as a cutlery- and steel-manufacturing business in the Attercliffe area of Sheffield. By the 1820s, it had grown into a large concern, focused on producing steel, and based at works on West Street near the city centre. Naylor retired, enabling four members of the Sanderson family to take control and rename the firm as "Sanderson Brothers". Over the next couple of decades, they took on various sites in the city to house their growing concern, and in 1835 they took over a large site on the edge of the hamlet of Darnall.

The site was already in industrial use, as the Don Glass Works, which English Heritage believe were probably already established in 1793, centred on a glass cone. The Sanderson Brothers were able to acquire the site on a 21-year lease for £13/13/0 annual rent. As part of this, it appears that they took over the glassworks, where possible learning technological advances in one industry to develop the other, and perhaps adapting the glass cone into a cementation furnace. Both cementation and crucible furnaces were definitely in use, but the glassworks was sold off during the 1850s to Melling, Carr and Co, who operated it until the start of the 20th century. Although the glassworks then closed, and there are no above-ground remains, English Heritage consider it likely that there are significant underground structures, along with discarded glass, and this forms part of the justification for the listing of the site as a Scheduled Ancient Monument.

== Expansion ==
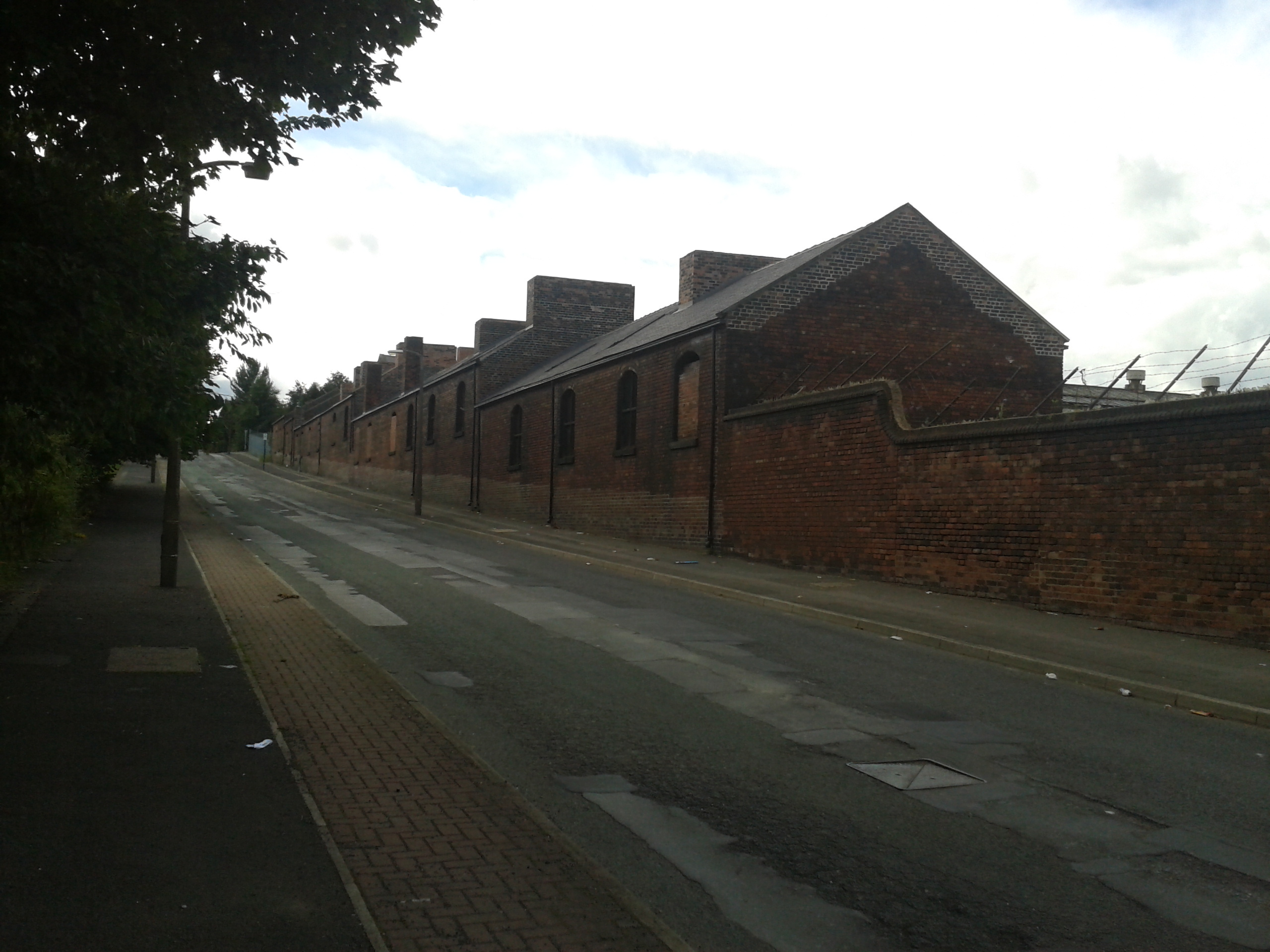
South East Crucible Steel Shops, dating from the 1870s

The establishment was successful and, in 1871, Sandersons decided to concentrate production at the Darnall site. To increase capacity, the firm constructed several new buildings in 1871 and 1872, and these are the oldest surviving structures on the site. Cementation furnaces had fallen out of favour, and the new buildings instead contained 180 crucible furnaces. Two abutting ranges of steel shops survive, both single-storey, in brick with asbestos cement, roofed partly in slate and partly in corrugated asbestos. The south-east range provided 84 holes for steel manufacture, while the south range had 24, designed to allow the casting of big objects using the "continuous teeming" method of production; a further west range was similar to the south range, giving a total of 132 melting holes. The south range alone cost £6000 to construct, and it remained in use for around fifty years, briefly resuming production during the Second World War. The two ranges are Grade II* listed and form the core of the Scheduled Ancient Monument.

At the same time, ancillary structures were added, including a two-storey office building, lodge, weighbridge and boundary walls. Constructed in brick, these all survive and are Grade II listed, and also form part of the Scheduled Ancient Monument.

In 1873 and 1874, a further range of crucible furnaces was added, powered by a Siemens gas furnace, with its own gas plant adjoining. This was one of the first in the city, giving the same capacity as sixty traditional crucible furnaces.

== Kayser Ellison works and merger ==
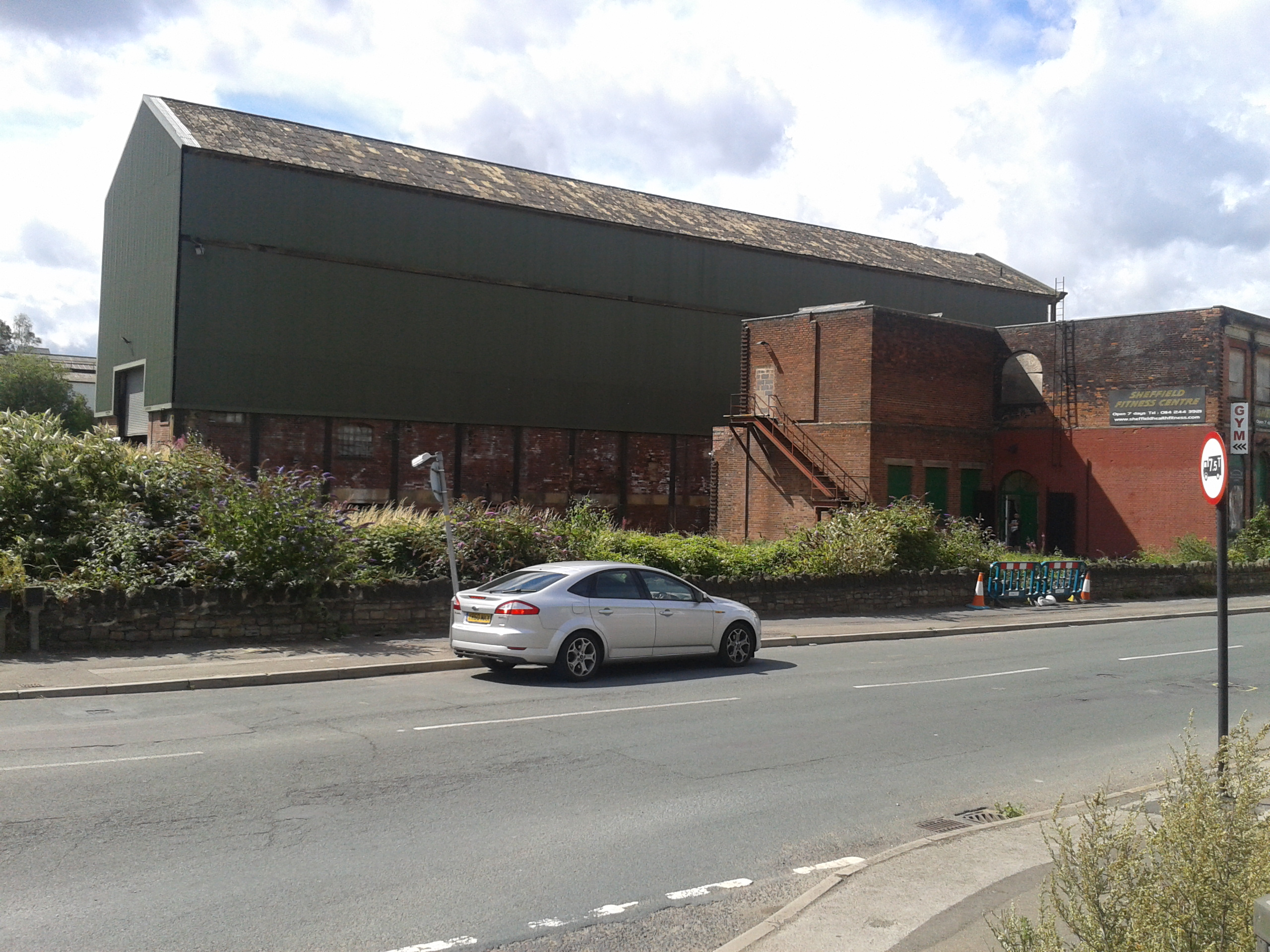
Steel Working Shop of 1913, constructed by Kayser Ellison

In 1912, Kayser, Ellison and Co. decided to establish a new steelworks, using electric arc furnaces, and adjoining the existing Darnall Works. Completed the following year, it included two large buildings: a two-storey heat treatment workshop and a three-storey steel working shop. In each, a steel frame is infilled with brick, glass and concrete, and the roofs are of corrugate iron. This form of construction was then novel, and this contributes to the listing of each at Grade II.

In 1934, Sandersons transferred their works to Kayser Ellison, combining the two sites to form a new, larger Darnall Works. Sandersons had finally stopped using their cementation furnaces in the 1920s, and Kayser Ellison soon demolished these, along with the west range of crucible steel shops from the 1870s.

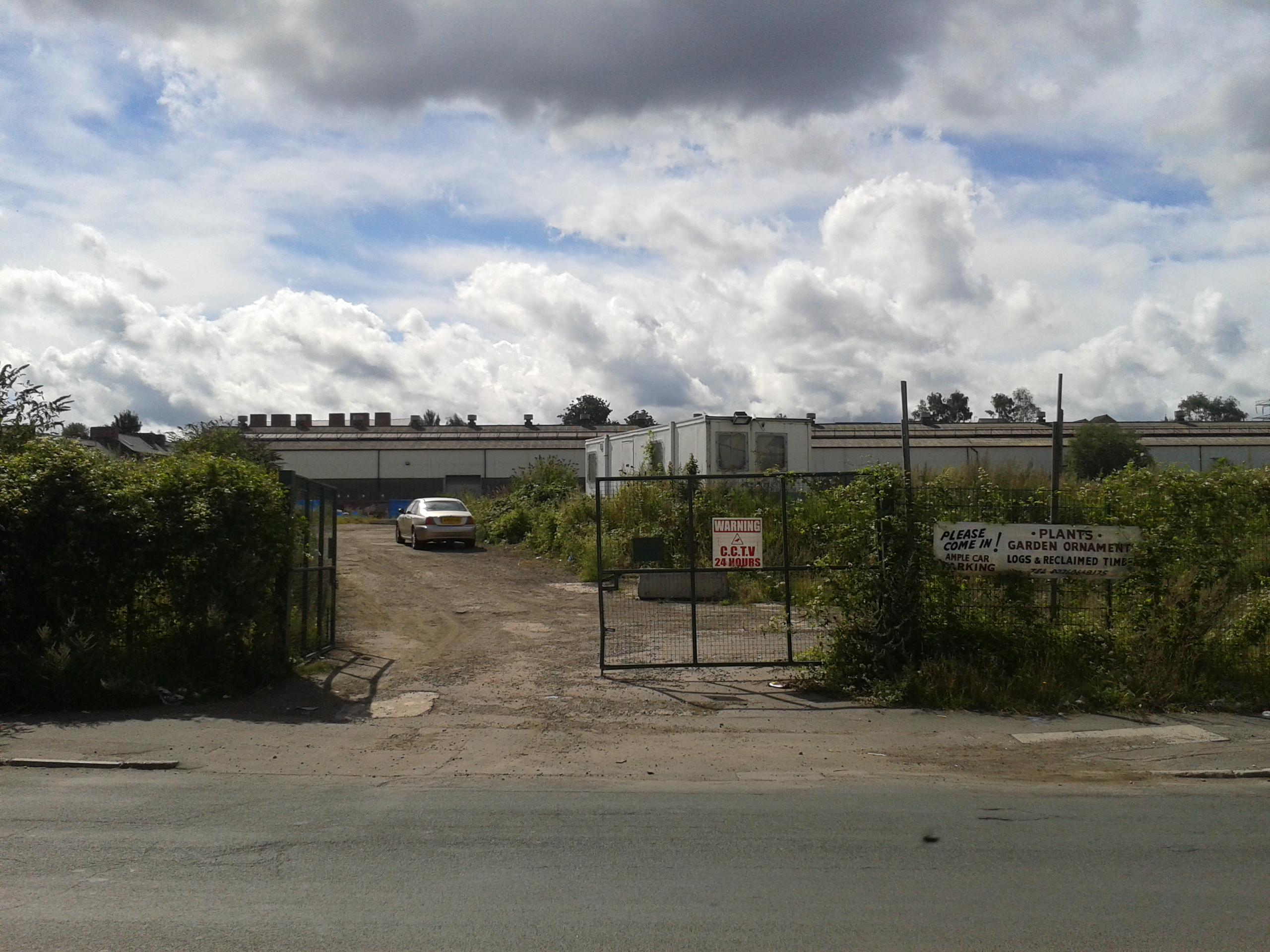
Main building of 1967

Kayser Ellison merged with Sandersons in 1960, forming Sanderson Kayser. A new main building was completed in 1967, incorporating a former stock warehouse, and measuring 500 by 59 feet (152 by 18 m) in plan and more than 18 feet (5.5 m) high, with a further 200-foot-long bay containing the new heat treatment workshop. This building contained several large furnaces, using butane in a first for the city. This allowed many buildings to be put to new uses: the south-east crucible shops as stores, the heat treatment workshop as a stock grinding plant, and the steel working shop as an annealing and cleaning plant. The gas-fired crucible furnaces and the gas plant were demolished, but English Heritage believe that substantial remains of these exist below ground.

By the end of the 20th century, Sanderson Kayser had concentrated production on its nearby Newhall Road site, and left the Darnall Works disused.

== Restoration ==
Although the site became largely derelict, most of the buildings survived, and it was established that these included the only remaining large complex of crucible furnaces, and the only known remains in the United Kingdom of gas fired crucible furnaces.

Interest in the buildings grew after they were featured in a 2001 English Heritage publication, One Great Workshop. This argued that Sheffield's metalworking heritage could help regenerate areas of the city. A plan to restore the listed buildings and construct new warehouses on the remainder of the site, enabling the return of steelmaking to the area, was announced in 2006. However, the scheme required local residents to relocate, and it did not proceed. Instead, by 2010, £800,000 was raised to restore the Grade II* buildings at the site: the south-east and south crucible workshops; repairing their roofs and enabling reuse of the structures.
