= Carl Wark =

Promontory in Sheffield, England

Coordinates: 53°19′46″N 1°36′46″W

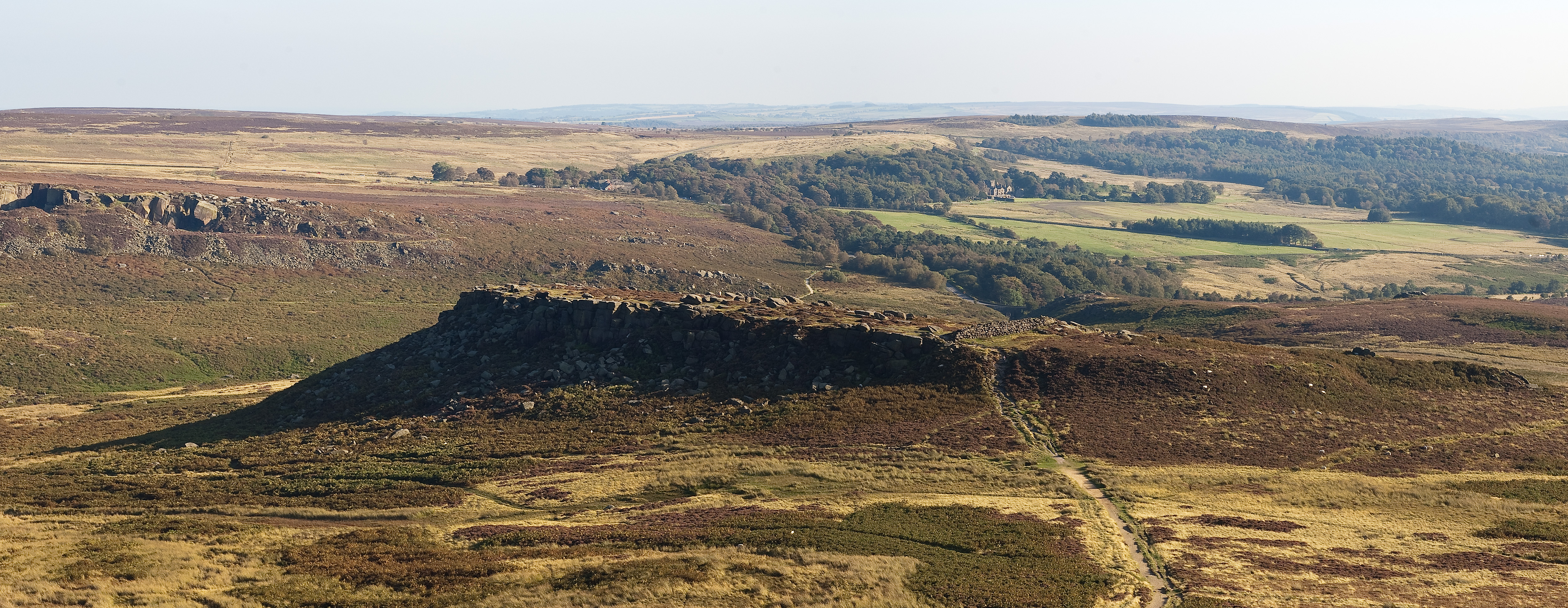
Carl Wark viewed from Higger Tor

Carl Wark (sometimes Carl's Wark) is a rocky promontory on Hathersage Moor in the Peak District National Park, just inside the boundary of Sheffield, England. The promontory is faced by vertical cliffs on all but one side, which is protected by a prehistoric embankment. The cliffs and embankment form an enclosure that has been interpreted as an Iron Age hill fort, though the date of construction and purpose of the fortifications remains unknown. The site is a scheduled monument.

== Geography ==
=== Location ===
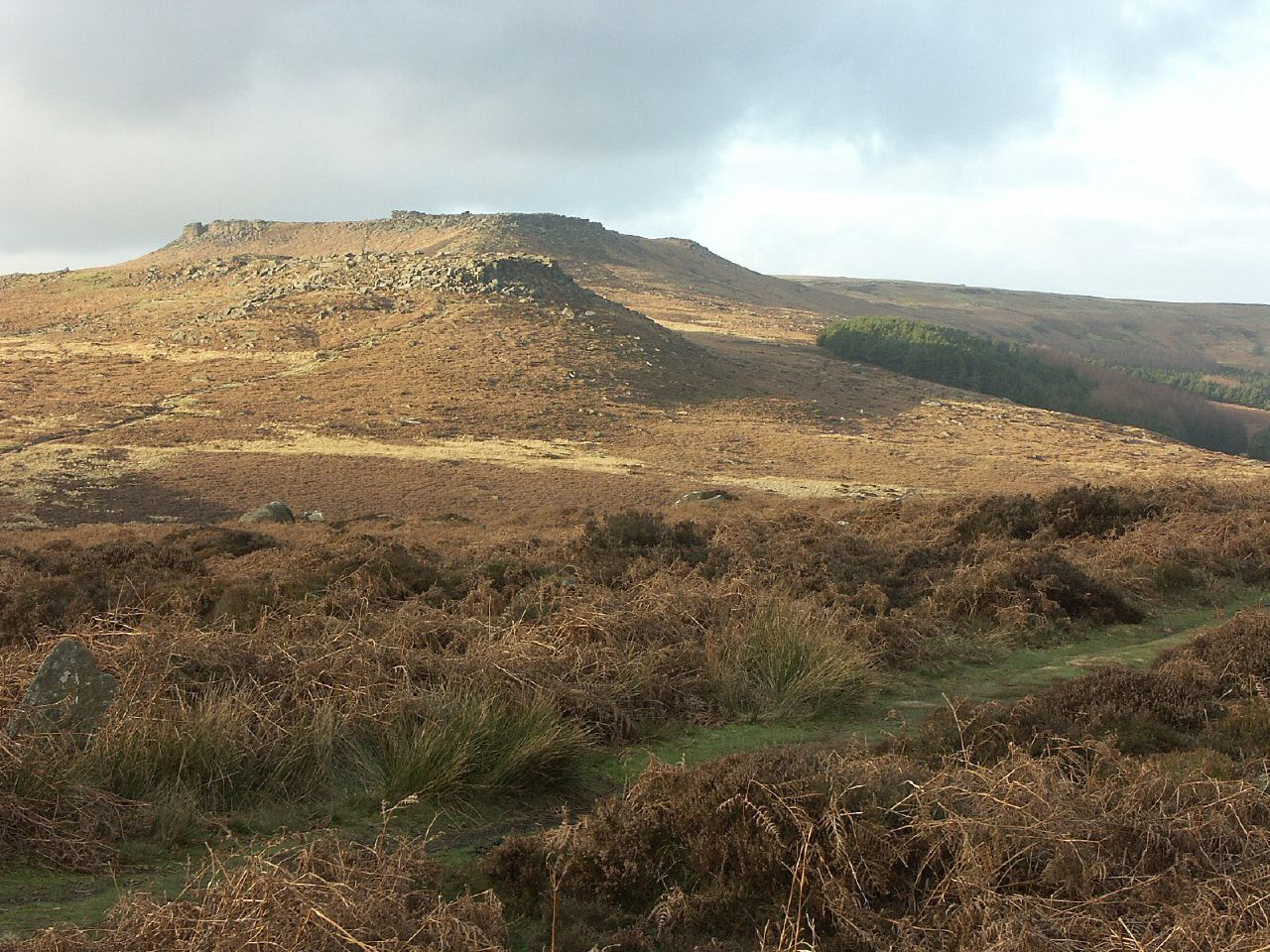
Hathersage Moor from the south showing Carl Wark overlooked by Higger Tor

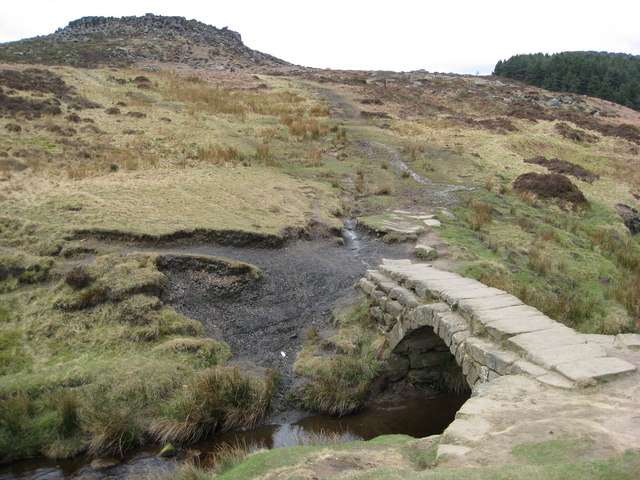
Carl Wark viewed from Burbage Brook

Carl Wark is located at grid reference SK259814, at an elevation of about 370 metres (1,214 ft) above sea level. Hathersage is about 3 kilometres (1.86 mi) to the west; Sheffield City Centre about 11 kilometres (6.8 mi) to the north-east. Historically this was within the ancient county of Derbyshire, but the surrounding area was annexed to the City of Sheffield in 1933, and now lies in the ceremonial county of South Yorkshire.

The promontory is a Millstone Grit outcrop situated in Hathersage Moor. From the north it is overlooked by the higher 434 metres (1,424 ft) peak of Higger Tor. To the east is the valley of the Burbage Brook, which is overlooked by Burbage Rocks, a Millstone Grit escarpment. The land gently slopes away to the south following the course of Burbage Brook into the valley of the River Derwent. To the south-west, the land rises towards Winyards Nick and Over Owler Tor.

=== Layout ===
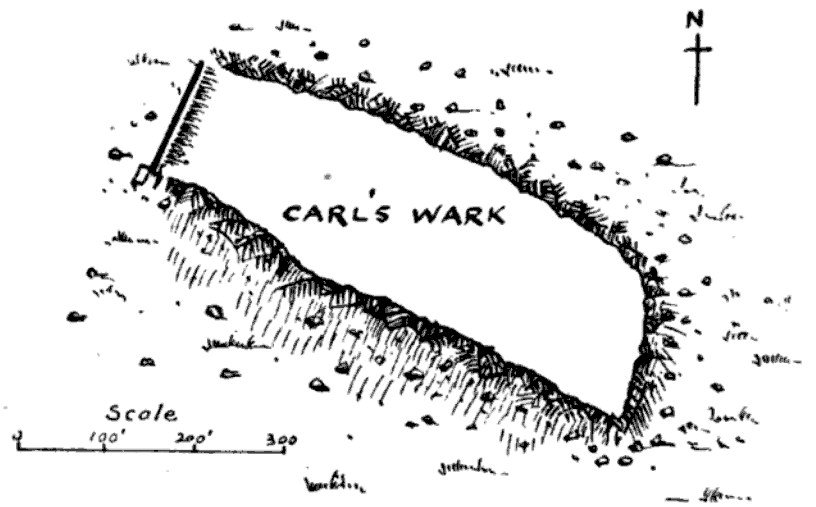
1903 plan of Carl Wark

The promontory is approximately 230 metres (750 ft) long and 60 metres (200 ft) wide, oriented south-east to north-west. It gently slopes down to the west; at the peak of the promontory an area of 0.7 hectares (1.7 acres)—180 metres (590 ft) long, 60 metres (200 ft) wide—is enclosed by natural cliffs enhanced with man-made fortifications. The eastern and north-eastern sides of this enclosure are faced with vertical cliffs of up to 10 metres (33 ft) in height. The southern edge of the enclosure consists of large earth-fast boulders that have been reinforced with millstone grit blocks, forming a wall 2–2.5 metres (6.6–8.2 ft) high. A rampart across the western end of the promontory completes the enclosure. The rampart is 40 metres (130 ft) long and 8 metres (26 ft) wide at its base, rising to a height of 3 metres (9.8 ft). It is constructed of a turf bank that is lined on its outer face with gritstone blocks. Within the southern wall, about 10 metres (33 ft) from the western rampart there is a 2-metre (6.6 ft) wide entrance. This entrance is a curved passage through the rock face with 2.5-metre (8.2 ft) walls on each side.

At the south end of the rampart there are the remains of a shelter, possibly a shieling, built using stones from the rampart. Around the base of the cliff at the eastern end of the promontory there is evidence of millstone production, probably dating from the 16th or 17th century.

== History ==
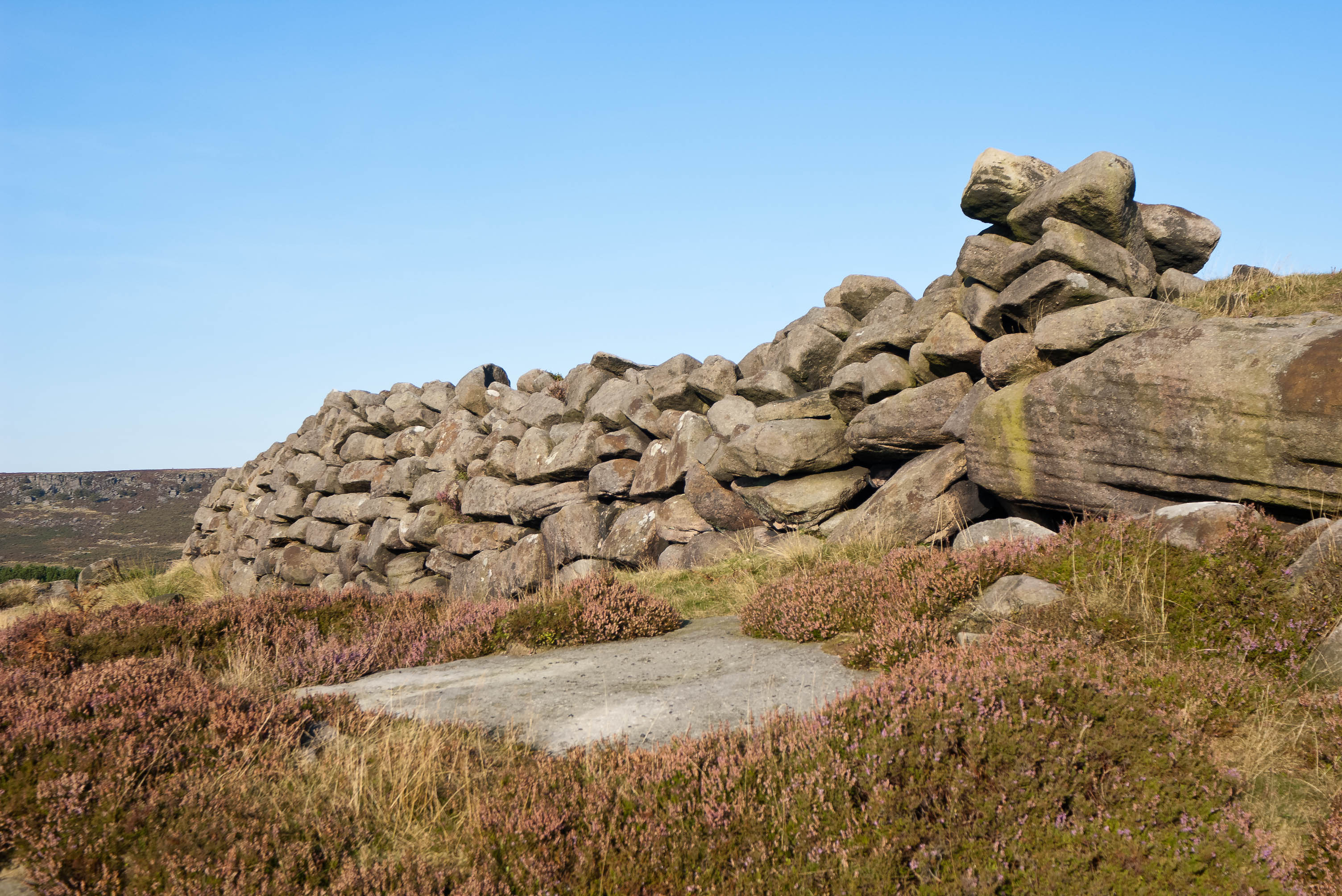
Outer stone face of the western rampart

The date and purpose of the construction of the rampart at Carl Wark are uncertain. It has been described as being "unlike any other [structure] found in Northern England." It is widely postulated to be a hill fort of Iron Age origin, perhaps dating from the 8th to the 5th centuries BC, though a similar enclosure at Gardom's Edge has been dated to the late Bronze Age, between 1300 and 900 BC. There is no evidence of settlement within the enclosure so it is unlikely that the site was used for a continuously occupied fort; it may have been used as a place of refuge for a population living in the surrounding area or it may have had some ceremonial purpose.

Antiquarian Hayman Rooke, writing in 1785, gave one of the earliest descriptions of the structure. He thought that it was built by the British Celtic peoples, and surmised that "it is natural to imagine, from the many sacred erections, that this place must have been intended for holy uses, or a court of justice". In 1861 historian John Gardner Wilkinson wrote that the site "bears the marked characteristics of an ancient British [Iron Age] fort", whilst antiquarian and barrow-digger Thomas Bateman stated that he thought the encampment had been set up as a defence against Constantine the Great during the Roman rule of Britain. Isaac Chalkley Gould also dismissed Rooke's idea that the enclosure had a sacred use, writing that it may have been used as a temporary fortified camp or refuge. Following a limited excavation of the turf embankment by Frank Gerald Simpson in 1950, Cecily Margaret Piggott concluded that the rampart was constructed in the Early Middle Ages possibly in the 5th or 6th century as it is similar in construction techniques to some ramparts of this period in Scotland. Some more recent historians agree with the view that the fortifications date from 'the Romano-British period at the start of the Dark Ages, maybe about 500 AD'. Norman Price (1953) described Carl Wark as the site of a pre-Roman Celtic British encampment, later used for defence in the 6th century by Arthurian knight Sir Lamoracke, who he states was also known as Llywarch. More recent assessments suggest that the site may have been in use since the Neolithic period, perhaps with multiple uses and phases of construction.

The origin of the name Carl Wark is uncertain. Rooke used the name "Cair's Work" in his 1785 description, whereas Bateman used "Carleswark". Sheffield historian and folklorist S. O. Addy, writing in 1893, posited that the name is Old Norse in origin, meaning 'The Old Man's Fort', where the 'Old Man' refers to the devil—suggesting that the 9th to 10th century Danish settlers in the area regarded the enclosure as ancient and mysterious. The 1802 Derbyshire edition of The Beauties of England and Wales refers to a rock on the site named "Cair's Chair" suggesting the Welsh word Caer meaning fort or rampart as a possible origin - Cair being an old spelling variant.

A scene from the 1987 film The Princess Bride was filmed nearby at Carl Wark with Higger Tor visible in the background.

== See also ==
- Wincobank (hill fort)
