= Shiregreen and Brightside =

Electoral ward in the City of Sheffield, South Yorkshire, England

Coordinates: 53.412°N 1.432°W

- Shown within Sheffield
- Population: 20,826 (2011 census)
- Metropolitan borough: City of Sheffield
- Metropolitan county: South Yorkshire
- Region: Yorkshire and the Humber
- Country: England
- Sovereign state: United Kingdom
- UK Parliament: Sheffield Brightside and Hillsborough
- Councillors: Dawn Dale (Labour and Co-operative); Mark Rusling (Labour and Co-operative); Garry Weatherall (Sheffield Community Councillors Group)

Shiregreen and Brightside ward—which includes the districts of Brightside, Shiregreen, and Wincobank—is one of the 28 electoral wards in City of Sheffield, England. It is located in the northern part of the city and covers an area of 6.5 km^{2}. The population of this ward in 2011 was 20,826 people in 8,696 households. It is one of the wards making up the Sheffield Brightside and Hillsborough parliamentary constituency.

== Districts of Shiregreen and Brightside ward ==
=== Brightside ===
Brightside (grid reference SK375898) is an industrial area of Sheffield, lying on a hill north of Attercliffe and the River Don. Brightside and Carbrook Co-operative Society opened its first shop in 1868, taking its name from this area and the nearby district of Carbrook.

=== Shiregreen ===
Shiregreen (grid reference SK370930) is a mainly residential area to the north of Firth Park and north-west of Meadowhall. The settlement originated in the Middle Ages around the farmstead later known as Crowder House, first known from a deed of 1402. A number of hamlets stood on the site, including Reynaldthorpe, Over Hartley and Hartley Brook. Nearby cottages were built, known as the Bell Houses and the Hadfield Houses, housing farm workers and a fork-making industry. Both sets of houses gave their names to roads in the area, Bellhouse Road and Hatfield House Lane. The Church of St James and St Christopher is located on Bellhouse Road in Shiregreen.

=== Wincobank ===
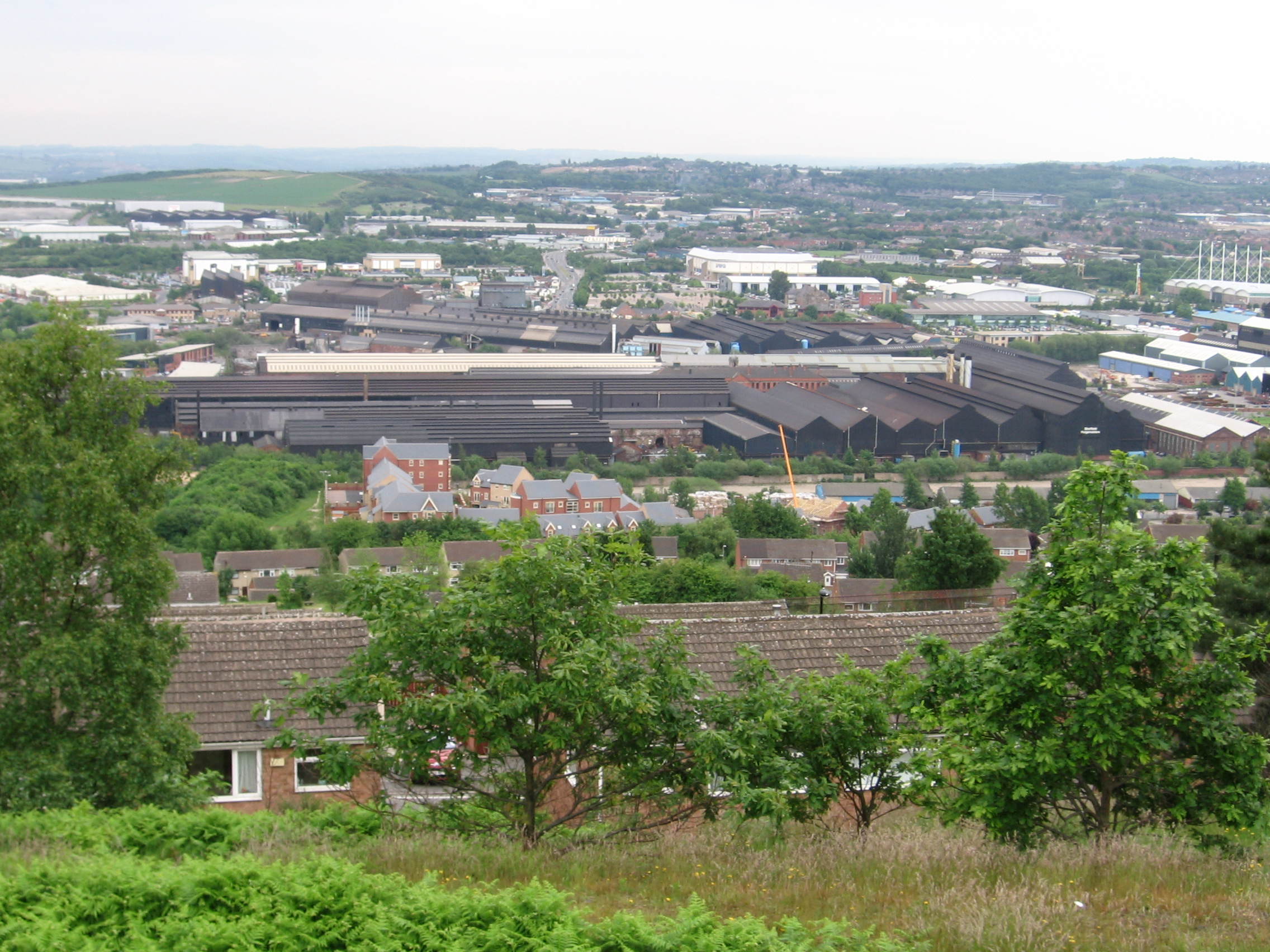
Wincobank - Don Valley from Fort

Wincobank (/ˈwɪŋkəˌbæŋk/ WINK-ə-bank; grid reference SK383913) is a suburb of Sheffield, located in the north-east of the city, overlooking the nearby Meadowhall shopping centre and the Tinsley Viaduct.

An Iron Age hill fort was constructed at Wincobank by the Celtic Brigantes tribe, standing on the summit of a steep hill above the River Don. It is possible that here, during the 1st century, the Brigantes attempted to defend against the northward advance of the Roman legions. An ancient defensive dyke called Roman Rig runs from the fort to Mexborough.

Wincobank is home to St Thomas Boxing School which has produced some of Britain's best boxers of recent years including Herol 'Bomber' Graham, Naseem Hamed and Johnny Nelson.

The labour activist Jack Murphy was born in Wincobank .

In 1922 the artist, Stanley Royle, painted the view from Wincobank in his painting, Sheffield from Wincobank Wood, one of four large views in oils of Sheffield, commissioned by Frederick Horner, a local art dealer.

Concord Park lies between Shiregreen and Wincobank.
