= Listed buildings in Rotherham (Keppel Ward) =

Keppel is a ward in the Metropolitan Borough of Rotherham, South Yorkshire, England. The ward contains 13 listed buildings that are recorded in the National Heritage List for England. Of these, one is listed at Grade II*, the middle of the three grades, and the others are at Grade II, the lowest grade. The ward contains the suburb of Kimberworth to the north of the centre of Rotherham, the village of Thorpe Hesley further to the north, and the surrounding area. The listed buildings consist of houses and associated structures, farmhouses and farm buildings, churches, a commemorative column, a milepost, and a war memorial.

== Key ==
Grade	Criteria
II*	Particularly important buildings of more than special interest
II	Buildings of national importance and special interest

== Buildings ==
Name and location	Photograph	Date	Notes	Grade
41 and 43 Scholes Lane and outbuildings 53.45225°N 1.42358°W	—	Late 15th to early 16th century	A farmhouse and farm buildings, the older part has a timber framed core, encased in sandstone and brick, and largely rendered. The roofs are in tile, with some pantile. They from a U-shpaed plan, with the houses on the front and the farm buildings at the rear, and mostly have two storeys.	II
146 Scholes Lane and barn 53.45793°N 1.41538°W	—	Early 16th century {probable)	The building has a timber framed core, it was later encased in sandstone, and has stone slate eaves courses and a hipped roof. There are two storeys and three bays. The house is in the right bay, and has a Welsh slate roof, a pebbledashed front, a porch, and casement windows. The barn has an asbestos sheet roof, and it contains double doors, casement windows, and slit vents.	II
67–71 Thorpe Street, Thorpe Hesley; 53.46148°N 1.43469°W	—	16th century	A row of cottages that was altered and extended in the 18th and 19th centuries. There is some internal timber framing, the walls are in sandstone, and the roofs are in Welsh slate at the front and stone slate at the rear. There are two storeys, six bays, and two rear outshuts. The windows are casements.	II
Monks' Smithy House; 53.45061°N 1.42563°W	—	16th or 17th century	Originally a farmhouse with attached farm buildings, the building is in gritstone and sandstone, it incorporates earlier material, and has a stone slate roof. There are two storeys, with the house on the left. The house has quoins, a central doorway with a chamfered round arch, and casement windows. On the farm buildings are external stone steps, and the openings include doorways, windows, and slit vents.	II
Grange Park Farmhouse; 53.44249°N 1.42467°W	—	1672	The farmhouse is in sandstone on a chamfered plinth, with quoins and a pantile roof. There are two storeys, three bays, and a single-storey extension on the front. The doorway has a chamfered quoined surround, the windows are a mix of sashes and casements, and in the left return is a three-light mullioned window with a hood mould.	II
Hesley Hall; 53.45894°N 1.44219°W		Early to mid 18th century	Wings were added to the house in the 19th century. It is in sandstone on a plinth, with quoins, a floor band, and a Welsh slate roof. There are two storeys, five bays, and two parallel rear wings. The doorway has an architrave, a keystone, and a segmental pediment on consoles, and the windows are sashes.	II
Farm buildings, Kimberworth; 53.43373°N 1.39616°W	—	Mid 18th century	The farm buildings, later used for other purposes, are in sandstone with roofs of corrugated iron and Welsh slate. They form two ranges at right angles, one range a barn, and the other longer range includes a dovecote and a rear wing. The dovecote has three storeys and the rest have two. The barn has quoins, and contains segmental-arched openings with keystones, and vents. The dovecote has a mullioned window in the ground floor and a Venetian window in the top floor, and a hipped roof.	II,
Grange Lane Farmhouse; 53.44886°N 1.42784°W	—	Late 18th century	The farmhouse, later divided, is in sandstone on a plinth, with quoins, and a tile roof with square-cut gable copings and moulded kneelers. There are three storeys, three bays and a two-storey rear wing. The central doorway has an architrave, a plain frieze and a moulded cornice. The windows in the lower two floors are sashes, and in the top floor they are casements.	II
Keppel's Column; 53.44796°N 1.41513°W		1776–81	The column was designed by John Carr to commemorate Admiral Keppel. It is in sandstone, and consists of a massive Tuscan column about 35 metres (115 ft) high. There is a blocked doorway in the plinth, round-headed windows on the shaft, and a rectangular viewing platform at the top with an iron balustrade.	II*
Holy Trinity Church, Thorpe Hesley; 53.45964°N 1.43176°W		1837–39	The church was designed by J. P. Pritchett, and is in sandstone with a Welsh slate roof. It consists of a nave and a chancel in one unit, a projection at the east end, a northeast vestry, and a slim west steeple. The steeple has a tower with three stages, a south porch and lancet windows with piers rising to pinnacles in the bottom stage, and clock faces in the middle stage. The top stage contains belfry openings with gablets, and is surmounted by a slender octagonal spire. The windows in the body of the church are lancets, and the east window has three stepped lancets.	II
St Thomas' Church, Kimberworth; 53.43394°N 1.39404°W		1841–43	The church was designed by Matthew Habershon, the tower was added in 1860, the chancel, organ chamber and vestry were added in 1881–82, and the interior was altered in 1892–93. The church is built in sandstone with Welsh slate roofs, and consists of a nave, a south porch, a chancel with a gabled projection to the south, a north vestry, and a west tower. The tower has clasping buttresses, a west window, slit windows, clock faces, two-light bell openings, and a quatrefoil-pierced parapet with eight pinnacles. Most of the windows are lancets, and the west window has three lights.	II
Milepost, Kimberworth; 53.43951°N 1.39889°W		Second half of 19th century	The milepost is on the north side of Wortley Road (A629 road). It consists of a sandstone pillar with cast iron overlay, and has a triangular section and a rounded top. On the top is inscribed "ROTHERHAM WORTLEY & FOUR LANE ENDS ROAD" and "ROTHERHAM", and on the sides are the distances to Rotherham, Penistone, and Chapeltown.	II
War memorial 53.45959°N 1.43187°W	—	1920	The war memorial stands to the west of Holy Trinity Church. It is in sandstone, and has a plinth, a square Doric column, and an entablature on which is the statue of a soldier holding a rifle. On the shaft of the column are the names of those lost in the two World Wars. The memorial is in an enclosure with low railings, and surrounded by four artillery shells.	II
