= Scholes Coppice =

Ancient woodland in South Yorkshire, England

Coordinates: 53°27′6″N 1°24′25″W

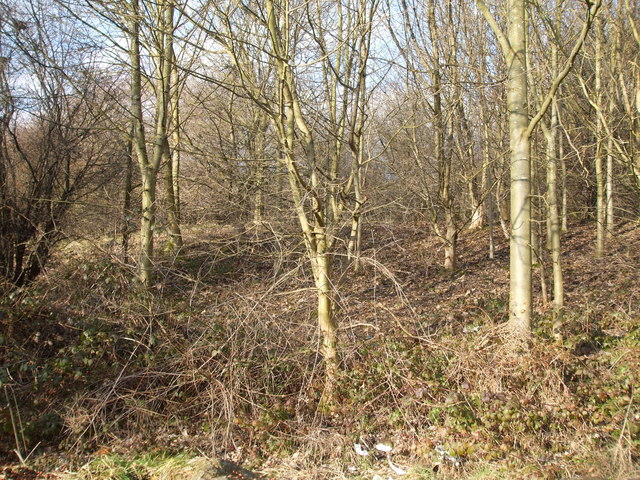
Trees in Scholes Coppice

Scholes Coppice (also called Scholes Wood) in an area of ancient woodland located to the north-west of Kimberworth in the Metropolitan Borough of Rotherham in South Yorkshire, England. It was once part of the Kimberworth Deer Park, and contains a number of archaeological sites, the most significant of which is thought to be an Iron Age hill fort. Known as Caesar's Camp or Castle Holmes, this Scheduled Ancient Monument was partially excavated in the 1990s. It consists of an outer bank 2–5 metres high and 15 metres wide that may have been topped by a wooden palisade, which is paralleled by a 15-metre-wide ditch. There is no obvious entrance to the site.

Scholes Coppice and the neighbouring Keppel's Field (which was once a part of the woodland) were designated a Local Nature Reserve by Rotherham Metropolitan Borough Council in 1996.
