= Coat of arms of the University of Sheffield =

Coat of arms of University of Sheffield, England

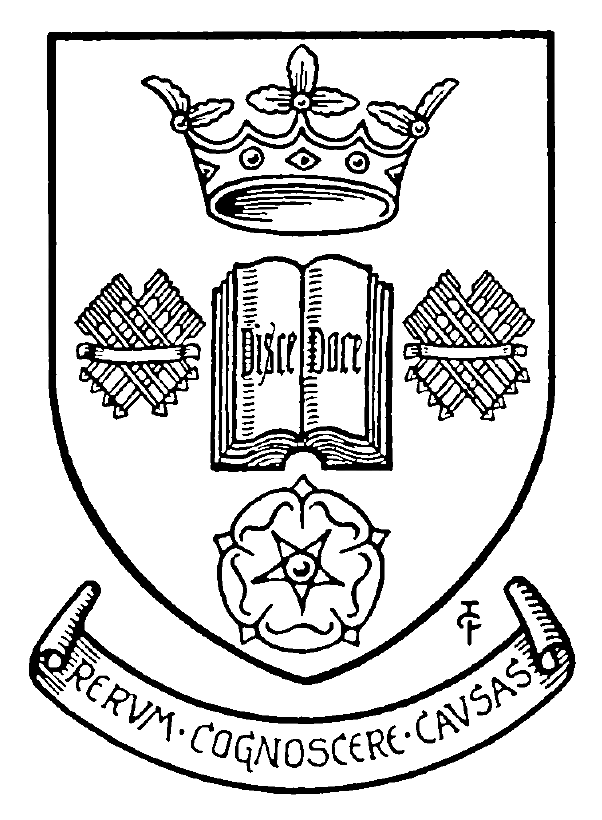

Versions
- Shield
- Armiger: University of Sheffield
- Adopted: 1905
- Crest: None
- Shield: Azure; a gold-edged open book; two sheaves of eight silver arrows; a gold crown; a white rose
- Supporters: None
- Motto: Rerum cognoscere causas
- Other elements: Inscribed at the centre of the book: Disce Doce
- Use: Degree certificates and other official documents; on buildings; on ornaments of governance (including ceremonial mace and staves)

The coat of arms of the University of Sheffield is the official heraldic emblem of the University of Sheffield. It was granted by the College of Arms on 28 June 1905, one month after the university's royal charter was sealed. The coat of arms was registered as a trademark by the University of Sheffield in 1992. In 2005, the university designed a logo consisting of a simplified version of the arms; the logo, however, does not supersede the heraldic symbol.

== Description and blazon ==
The arms depict a gold-edged open book with the Latin inscription Disce Doce ("Learn and Teach"), two sheaves of eight silver arrows on either side, the Crown of Success and the White Rose of York. In heraldic terminology, it is blazoned as:

Azure, an open book proper, edged gold, inscribed with the words Disce Doce between in fess two sheaves of eight arrows interlaced saltireways and banded argent, in chief an open crown or, and in base a rose also argent barbed and seeded proper.

Below the azure shield is a scroll that carries the Latin motto Rerum Cognoscere Causas ("To Discover the Causes of Things"), which was also used by Firth College, the predecessor of the University of Sheffield. The motto comes from verse 490 of Book Two of the Georgics by poet Virgil.

== Heraldic charges ==
Sheaves of arrows, a symbol for Sheffield

White Rose of York, a symbol for Yorkshire

The charges on the field of the escutcheon of the University of Sheffield are mainly inanimate objects - arrows, crown and book - as well as a plant - rose. The sheaves of arrows are a wordplay on the River Sheaf which runs through Sheffield, and also are a reference to the iron- and steel-making heritage of the city. Arrows were the main motif in the seals issued to the Burgery of Sheffield and the Twelve Capital Burgesses in 1554 by Queen Mary as a symbol for Sheffield, and they also appear in the coat of arms granted to the Sheffield Borough Council in 1875 and to the City of Sheffield in 1977.

The charge in the fess point is an open book with gilded edges inscribed with Disce Doce. The gold open crown above the book is the Crown of Success. Below the book is a white rose with seeds and barbs in their natural colours. It is the White Rose of York, a symbol for Yorkshire, which denotes the home county of the university.

== Gallery ==
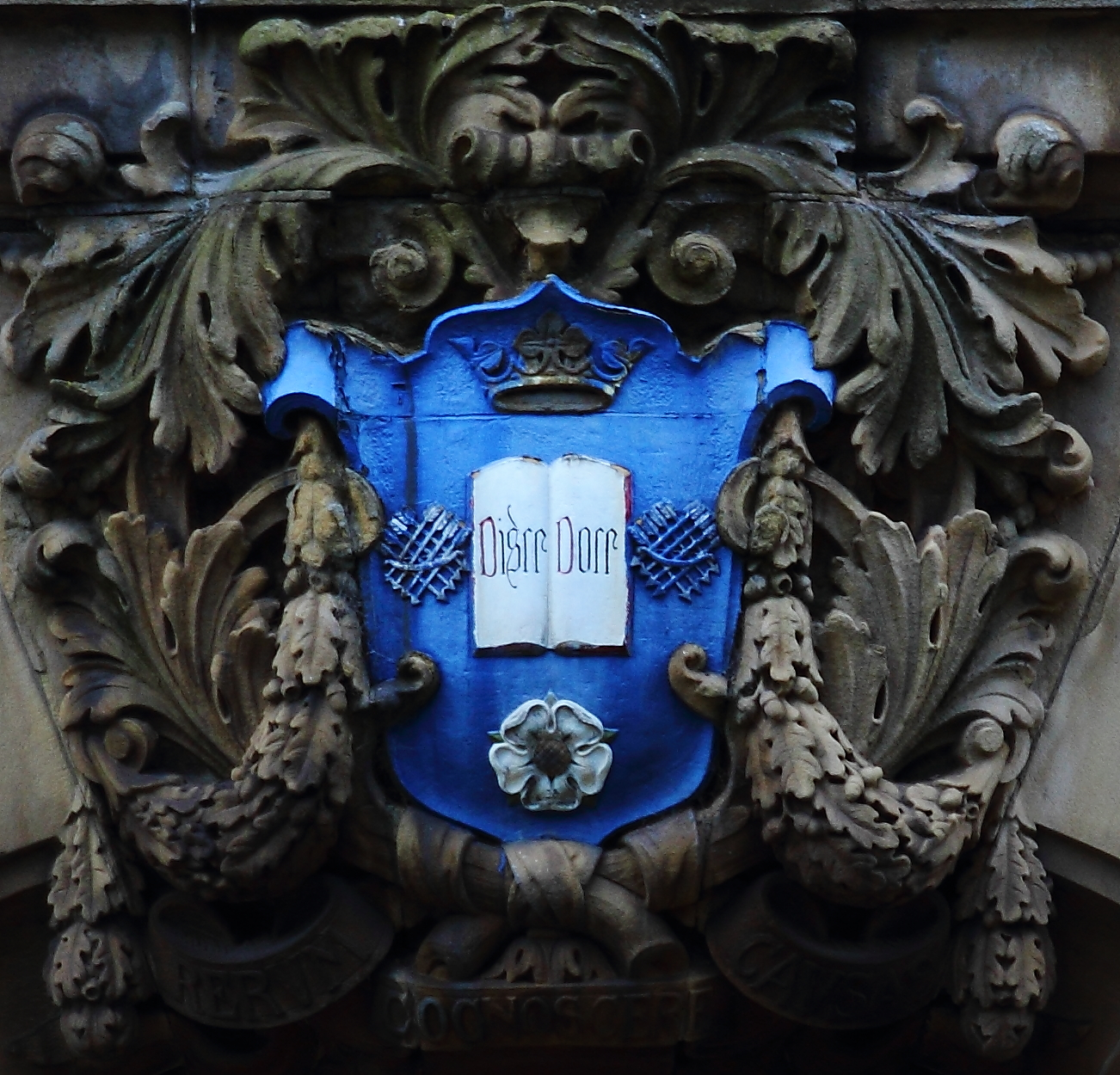
Coat of arms on the façade of the Sir Frederick Mappin Building

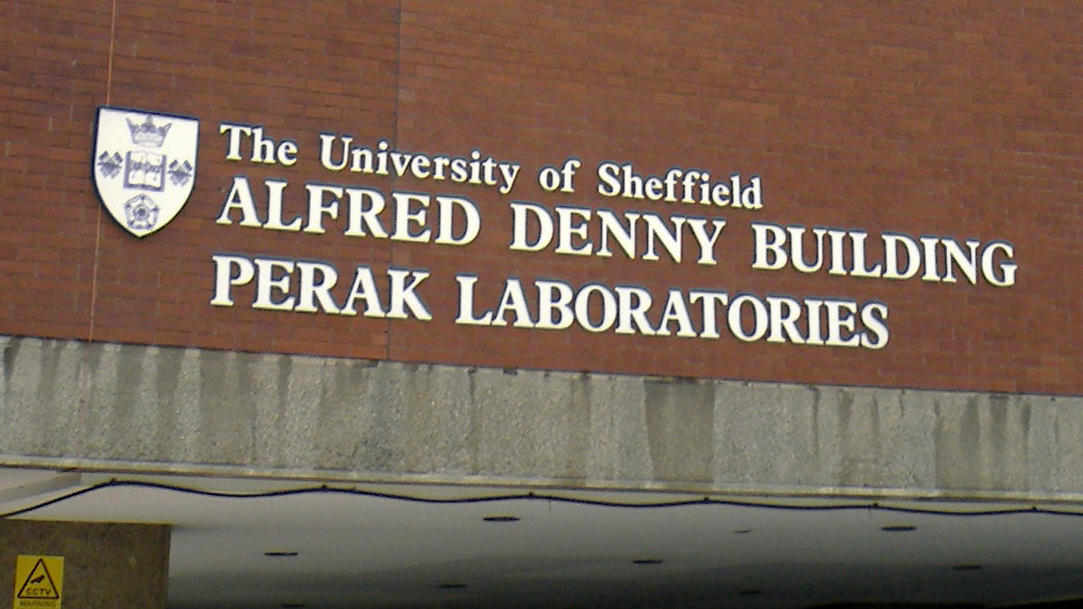
Shield on the Alfred Denny Building

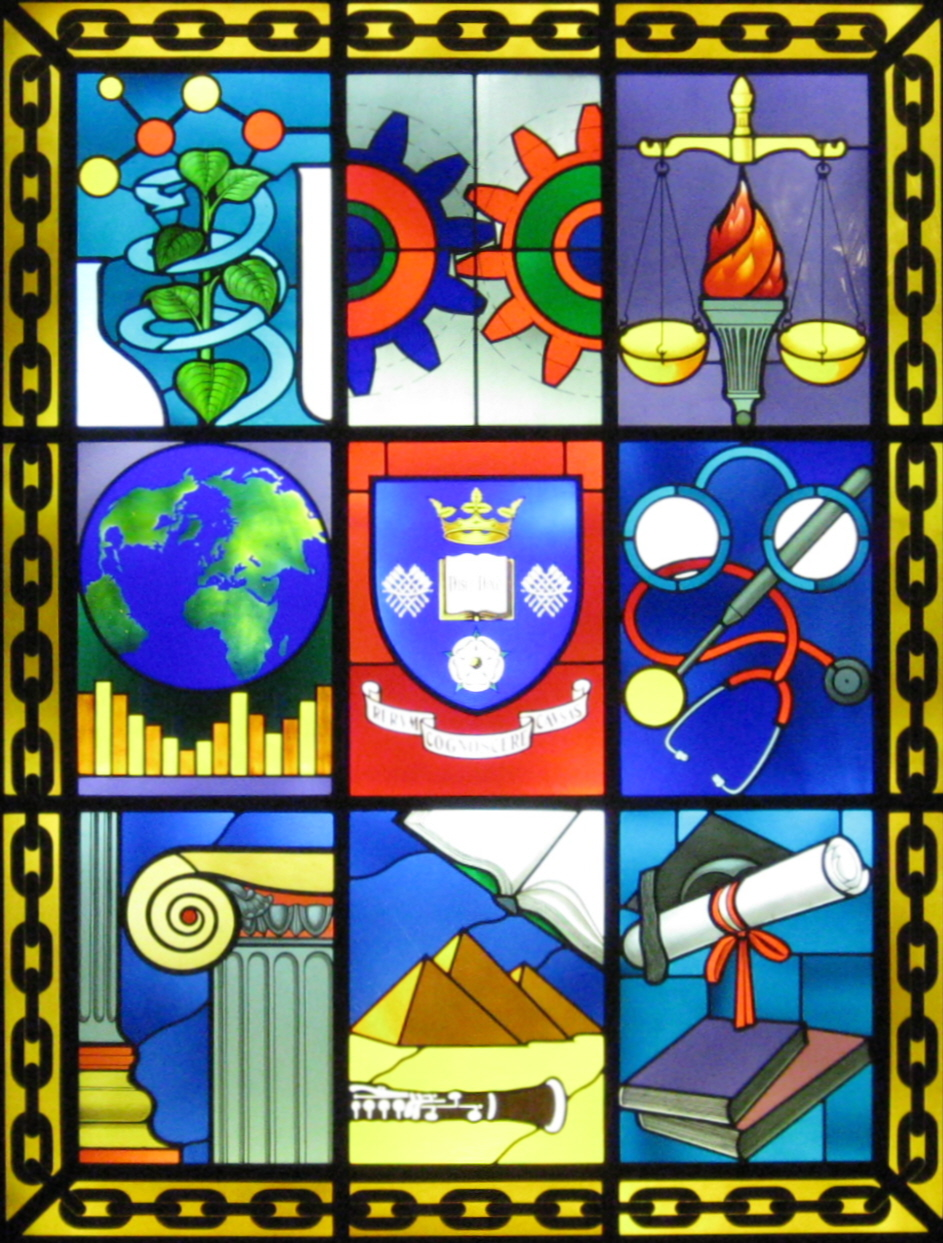
Stained glass panel in entrance hall of St George's Church

== See also ==
- Armorial of UK universities
- Felix, qui potuit rerum cognoscere causas
- University of Sheffield
