= Haymarket, Sheffield =

Street in Sheffield, England

Coordinates: 53.3836°N 1.4642°W

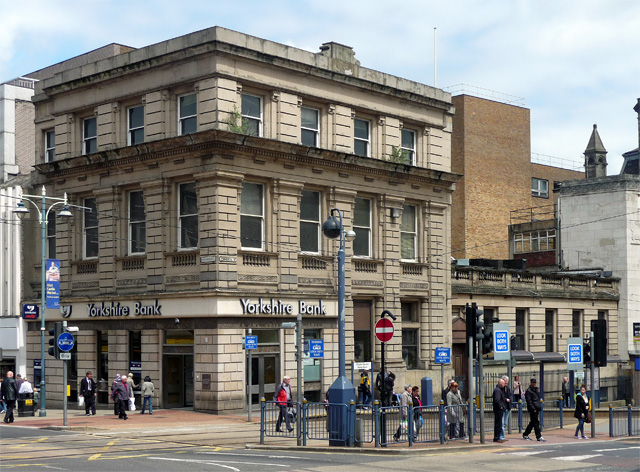
Fitzalan Square tram stop at the top of Haymarket.

Haymarket is a street and shopping area in the city centre of Sheffield in South Yorkshire, England. Haymarket connects Commercial Street to Waingate leading to Lady's Bridge and The Wicker area of the city.

== History ==
The street was one of the earliest in Sheffield, and was the location of the town's markets, first mentioned in 1296. It later became known for the sale of hay, from which its name arose. Norfolk Market Hall opened in 1851 and was in operation until 1959. Prior to the market, The Tontine Inn was on the site. After its demolition, shops were constructed to a design by Thomas and Peter H. Braddock, initially with balcony access to shops above, although these proved unsuccessful.

== Architecture ==
The west side of the street is lined with shops in a variety of styles. Harman and Minnis mention 25 Haymarket, demolished in 2024, built as simple houses in the early 19th century but with elaborate half-timbering and a bellcote added in the 20th century; 21 Haymarket designed by Arthur Davy in a moderne style, with a staircase tower; 17 Haymarket with a 19th-century stucco facade; and 13–15 Haymarket, a late Georgian building which previously operated as the Brunswick pub. On the east side is the Grade II listed former post office 2 Haymarket.
