= Waingate =

Street in Sheffield, England

Coordinates: 53.3848°N 1.4647°W

Waingate is a street and shopping area in the city centre of Sheffield in South Yorkshire, England. Waingate connects Haymarket to Lady's Bridge, which crosses the River Don and into The Wicker area of the city.

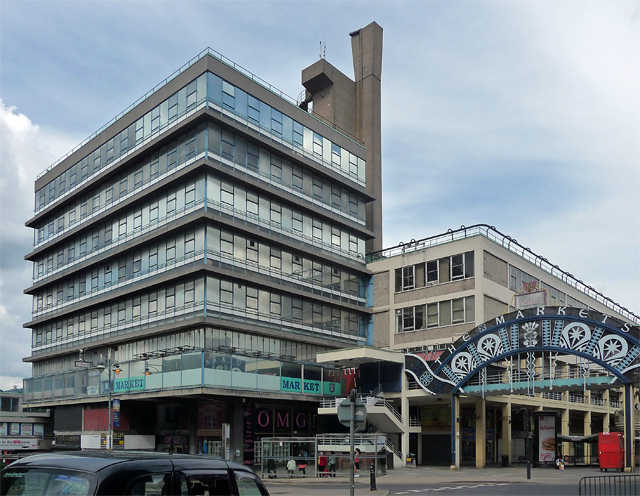
The former markets at Waingate

== History ==
The name "Waingate" dates to the 16th century, referring to a 'wagon way', which ran around the western edge of the moat of Sheffield Castle. On Ralph Gosling's 1736 map of Sheffield the road is named "Bridge Street", but on a 1771 plan it is named "Wain Gate". Following the slighting of Sheffield Castle in 1649, the street became built up with workshops and commercial buildings, with slaughterhouses by the River Don. The now derelict Sheffield Old Town Hall stands on Waingate, built between 1807 and 1808. Until the mid-1990s, Crown Court cases were heard at the Old Town Hall.

In 1927, the Brightside and Carbrook Co-operative constructed a large shop on the corner of Waingate and Exchange Street, followed in 1930 by the construction of the Castle Hill Market, with a main entrance on Waingate. The Co-operative store was destroyed during the Sheffield Blitz of 1940. In 1958, Sheffield City Council began construction of the Castle Market, extending the existing market to incorporate the site of the Co-op, the development including new shops facing onto Waingate. The former market site, now known as the Castlegate Quarter, is largely dominated by the excavation works on the site of Sheffield Castle.
