= Sheffield Improvement Act 1818 =

- Act of Parliament
- Parliament of the United Kingdom
- Long title: An Act for cleansing, lighting, watching, and otherwise improving the Town of Sheffield, in the County of York.
- Citation: 58 Geo. 3. c. liv

Dates
- Royal assent: 8 May 1818
Other legislation
Repealed by	Local Government Supplemental (No. 3) Act 1865

Status: Repealed

Text of statute as originally enacted

The Sheffield Improvement Act 1818 (58 Geo. 3. c. liv) was a local act of Parliament passed in 1818, regarding the administration of the town of Sheffield in the West Riding of Yorkshire.

Before 1818, the town was run by a mixture of bodies. The Sheffield Town Trust held responsibility for the repair of Lady's Bridge, Barkers Pool and various highways, and had traditionally contributed to general improvements to the town. The Church Burgesses also had the right to improve streets and bridges in the area of the church. By the nineteenth century, both organisations lacked the funds to construct significant improvements, and struggled to maintain existing infrastructure.

The Church Burgesses organised a public meeting on 27 May 1805 and proposed to apply to Parliament for an act to pave, light and clean the city's streets. The Town Trust's weak financial position was not public knowledge, and many at the meeting believed that it would be able to achieve these objectives, without the need for a new body which would have to levy rates. The proposal was defeated.

The idea of a commission was revived in 1810, and later in the decade Sheffield finally followed the model adopted by several other towns in petitioning for an act to establish an improvement commission. This was rewarded with the 1818 act, which established the commission and included a number of other provisions.

== Sheffield Improvement Commission ==
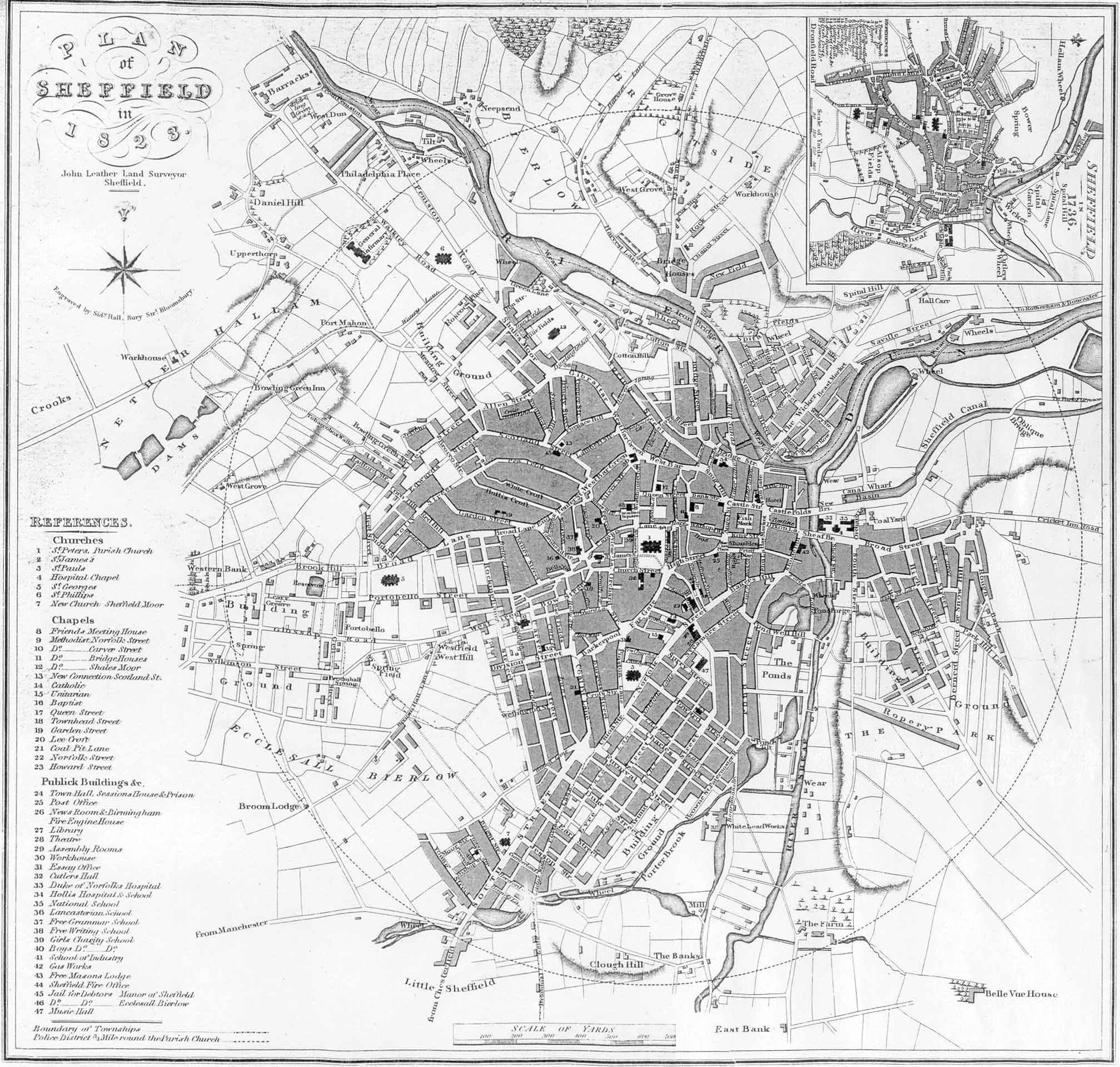
1823 plan of Sheffield, showing the Police District established by the act

The Town Trustees and the Master Cutler were given the right to appoint a commission of eighty members. Vacancies were filled by co-option. The commission was mandated to improve the cleaning, lighting and watching in an area within three-quarters of a mile of Sheffield Parish Church. This covered most of the built up area at the time, but did not include the emerging suburbs. In order to fulfil their mandate, the commission was awarded an annual levy of 1s 3d in the pound from all property in the town with a rental value over £7 per year.

The watching mandate did not amount to setting up a police force, but did increase the number of watchmen and gave them new powers. The act led to the appointment of a superintendent of police. By 1833, it employed fifty watchmen. They were given responsibilities for identifying obstructions to footpaths, excessive smoke emitted from chimneys and unsafe walls, cellars and middens.

The improvement commission met monthly. Meetings included "appeals from individuals, debate over priorities and contested interpretation of its statutory powers".

The watch was extensively reformed in 1836. Sheffield Town Council was established in 1843, and it took over responsibility for watching the following year, establishing the Sheffield City Police in the 1850s. It absorbed the remaining powers of the improvement commission in the 1860s.

== Other provisions ==
The act established the Sheffield Gas-Light Company, with the right to construct a gasworks at Shude Hill, to provide street lighting. The company was also permitted to supply private individuals.

All owners of steam engines in the town were required to consume the engine's smoke, on request, on pain of a £50 fine. This was never enforced. In addition, all occupiers were required to cleanse and sweep footways and channels in front of the premises before 10:00 on Wednesday and Saturday mornings. Those who did not comply were subject to a fine of ten shillings, and householders were regularly fined for a failure to do so.
