= Church Burgesses =

UK charity

The Church Burgesses, formerly known officially as the Twelve Capital Burgesses and Commonalty of the Town and Parish of Sheffield, are a charitable organisation in the city of Sheffield in South Yorkshire.

In 1297, the Burgery of Sheffield was established in the Charter to the Town of Sheffield. Thomas de Furnival, Lord of the Manor of Sheffield, granted land to the freeholders of Sheffield in return for an annual payment, and a Common Burgery administrated them.

In 1554, a charter established the Twelve Capital Burgesses, a petition to Mary Tudor, probably supported by the fifth Earl of Shrewsbury, presented by the inhabitants of Sheffield. The lands confiscated by King Edward were returned to the people under the 1554 Charter. The Burgesses were charged with providing stipends for three assistant ministers at the church and with the maintenance of the church. They were also given the power to maintain and improve streets and bridges in the environs of the church. In contrast to the Burgery, which was an elective body, the Burgesses were to fill empty positions by co-option.

Elsewhere in England, the existence of a church rate proved a source of conflict between members of the Church of England and nonconformists, and in some cities, church posts became politicised, but the existence of the Burgesses meant that no rate was levied in Sheffield.

In order to pay for their works, the Burgesses were endowed with land in the parish. From 1736 to 1829, they leased a large amount of land, second in the town only to the Duke of Norfolk. By 1833, they owned 146 acres (0.59 km^{2}). They received rental income from the land, and also income from investments. However, by the nineteenth century, this proved insufficient for them to undertake the maintenance and improvement work. In 1805, they convened a public meeting to discuss the formation of an Improvement Commission. Although this idea was initially rejected, the Sheffield Improvement Commission was established by the Sheffield Improvement Act 1818.

Relieved of their obligation to maintenance in the town, the Burgesses refocussed on a range of charitable works. Today it splits its income between "ecclesiastical purposes in support of the Church of England... education and for the betterment of the needy and deprived and ... the benefit of the community." In addition to supporting Sheffield Cathedral (the former parish church), it puts money towards the building of churches and payments towards Anglican clergy stipends throughout Sheffield. A separate trust, the Church Burgesses Educational Foundation, administers its educational funds.
