= Commissioners of Scotland Yard =

London and Westminster Streets Act 1662
- Act of Parliament
- Parliament of England
- Long title: An Act for repairing the High wayes and Sewers and for paving and keeping clean of the Streets in and about the Cities of London & Westminster and for reforming of Annoyances and Disorders in the Streets of and places adjacent to the said Cities and for the Regulating and Licensing of [Hackney] Coaches and for the enlarging of several strait & inconvenient Streets and Passages.
- Citation: 14 Cha. 2. c. 2 (Note: This is the citation in The Statutes of the Realm.); 13 & 14 Cha. 2. c. 2 (Note: This is the citation in The Statutes at Large.)
- Territorial extent: England and Wales

Dates
- Royal assent: 2 May 1662
- Commencement: 7 January 1662 (Note: Start of session.)
- Expired: 13 March 1679
- Repealed: 30 July 1948
Other legislation
Repealed by	Statute Law Revision Act 1948
Relates to	London Streets, etc. Act 1690

Status: Repealed

Text of statute as originally enacted

London Streets, etc. Act 1690
- Act of Parliament
- Parliament of England
- Long title: All Act for Paveing and Cleansing the Streets in the Cityes of London and Westminster and Suburbs and Liberties thereof and Out-Parishes in the County of Midlesex and in the Burrough of Southwarke and other places within the Weekly Bills of Mortality in the County of Surrey and for Regulating the Markets therein mentioned.
- Citation: 2 Will. & Mar. Sess. 2. c. 8
- Territorial extent: England and Wales

Dates
- Royal assent: 20 December 1690
- Commencement: 2 October 1690 (Note: Start of session.)
- Repealed: 30 July 1948
Other legislation
Amended by	Streets (London) Act 1696
Repealed by	Highways (No. 2) Act 1766; Paving, etc., of London Act 1768; City of London Sewerage Act 1771; Hay and Straw Act 1796; Statute Law Revision Act 1948
Relates to	Streets, London and Westminster Act 1662

Status: Repealed

Text of statute as originally enacted

The Commissioners of Scotland Yard was the informal name for the Commissioners for the Streets and Wayes, a body of improvement commissioners established in 1662 to manage and regulate various areas relating to streets and traffic in the cities of London and Westminster and the borough of Southwark. They were appointed under a 1662 act of the Parliament of England, London and Westminster Streets Act 1662 (14 Cha. 2. c. 2) which expired in 1679. The commissioners' office was attached to that of the Surveyor of the King's Works in Scotland Yard.

The 1662 act empowered Charles II of England to appoint up to 21 commissioners, who were authorised to:

- Determine encroachments by buildings onto the highway
- Manage the repair and paving of specific streets, including Pall Mall
- Enlarge various other specific streets, including St Martins Lane, and to demolish existing buildings where necessary and compensate the owners
- Levy charges on each householder to fund repair, paving and enlargement work
- License, tax and set maximum fares for hackney carriages
- Charge duty on hay and straw sold in city streets

To combat an apparent problem with people throwing coal ashes into the street, the act also required every person in London, Westminster, Southwark and surrounding suburbs to sweep the area in front of their house "... every Wednesday and every Saturday in the Weeke". The act also prohibited the hooping of barrels and sawing of stones or rough timber in the streets. Rakers and scavengers were to use "... a Bell Horne Clapper or otherwise [and] shall make distinct and loud noise and give notice to the Inhabitants of theire coming ..." so "... that all persons concerned may bring forth theire respective Ashes Dust Dirt Filth and Soil to the respective Carts or Carriages". These scavengers were to be elected according to existing customs, and within 20 days rubbish collection rates (to be paid quarterly) were to be set by churchwardens and other leaders of the parish.

Under the act, "... from Michaelmas until our Lady day ..." (29 September – 25 March) from dusk to 9 p.m. every householder was required to place a candle or lantern outside "... his house next the street to enlighten the same for Passengers ...". The act also ratified a decision by sewer commissioners on 8 August 1661 to construct two new sewers to drain the area near the Palace of Whitehall.

After the Great Fire of London in 1666, several acts to promote rebuilding vested the power of paving and sewer maintenance within the city solely in its Corporation. This restricted the Scotland Yard Commissioners to areas outside the city. The act was "to continue & be in force until the end of the First Session of the next p[er]liament", and when this happened in 1679 it was then "allowed to expire".

A 1690 act of Parliament, the London Streets, etc. Act 1690 (2 Will. & Mar. Sess. 2. c. 8) imposed sanitation requirements on the districts around London similar to those of the 1662 act, but did not revive the commissioners. Instead, powers of enforcing compliance were given to the justices of the peace. Sewerage in Westminster was transferred to the existing Westminster and Middlesex Commission of Sewers.

== Members and officers ==
As well as the 21 commissioners appointed by the king, the act provided that the Lord Mayor, Recorder, and Aldermen of the City of London; and the Dean, High Steward, Deputy Steward and the two High Burgesses of the City of Westminster should become joint commissioners with the same powers.

Charles Sackville, 6th Earl of Dorset was one of the initial Commissioners, as was the diarist John Evelyn, who described his fellows as "divers gentlemen of quality". Some MPs were commissioners, including John Ashburnham, Anthony Ashley-Cooper, Charles Berkeley, later Viscount Fitzhardinge, John Denham, William Glascock, Ranald Grahme, Robert Howard, Thomas Ingram, Daniel O'Neill, Richard Onslow, and Edmund Waller.

The commissioners were empowered to appoint a treasurer and other officers, and had to report annual accounts to the Court of Exchequer during trinity term.

== Bibliography ==
- John Raithby, ed. (1819), "Charles II, 1662 — An Act for repairing the High wayes and Sewers and for paving and keeping clean of the Streets in and about the Cities of London & Westminster and for reforming of Annoyances and Disorders in the Streets of and places adjacent to the said Cities and for the Regulating and Licensing of [Hackey] Coaches and for the enlarging of several strait & inconvenient Streets and Passages.", Statutes of the Realm: Volume 5: 1628–80, pp. 351–357
- John Raithby, ed. (1819), "William and Mary, 1690 — All Act for Paveing and Cleansing the Streets in the Cityes of London and Westminster and Suburbs and Liberties thereof and Out-Parishes in the County of Midlesex and in the Burrough of Southwarke and other places within the Weekly Bills of Mortality in the County of Surrey and for Regulating the Markets therein mentioned", Statutes of the Realm: Volume 6: 1685-94, pp. 231–236
- Webb, Sidney; Webb, Beatrice (1922). "Ch.4: The Improvement Commissioners". Statutory Authorities for Special Purposes. English Local Government. Vol. 4. London: Longman, Green. pp. 239–241, 323.
- Webb, Sidney; Webb, Beatrice (1908). "Ch.4: The City and Borough of Westminster". The Manor and the Borough, Part I. English Local Government. Vol. 2. London: Longman, Green. pp. 213–231.
- Vestry of the united parishes of St Margaret and St John the Evangelist, Westminster (June 1889). Special and annual report, with notes on local government in Westminster from pre-reformation times to the present day. Westminster: Wightman.
- Cannan, Edward (1896). The history of local rates in England, five lectures. London: Longmans. pp. 124–126.
