= 2 Haymarket =

Coordinates: 53.383264°N 1.464018°W

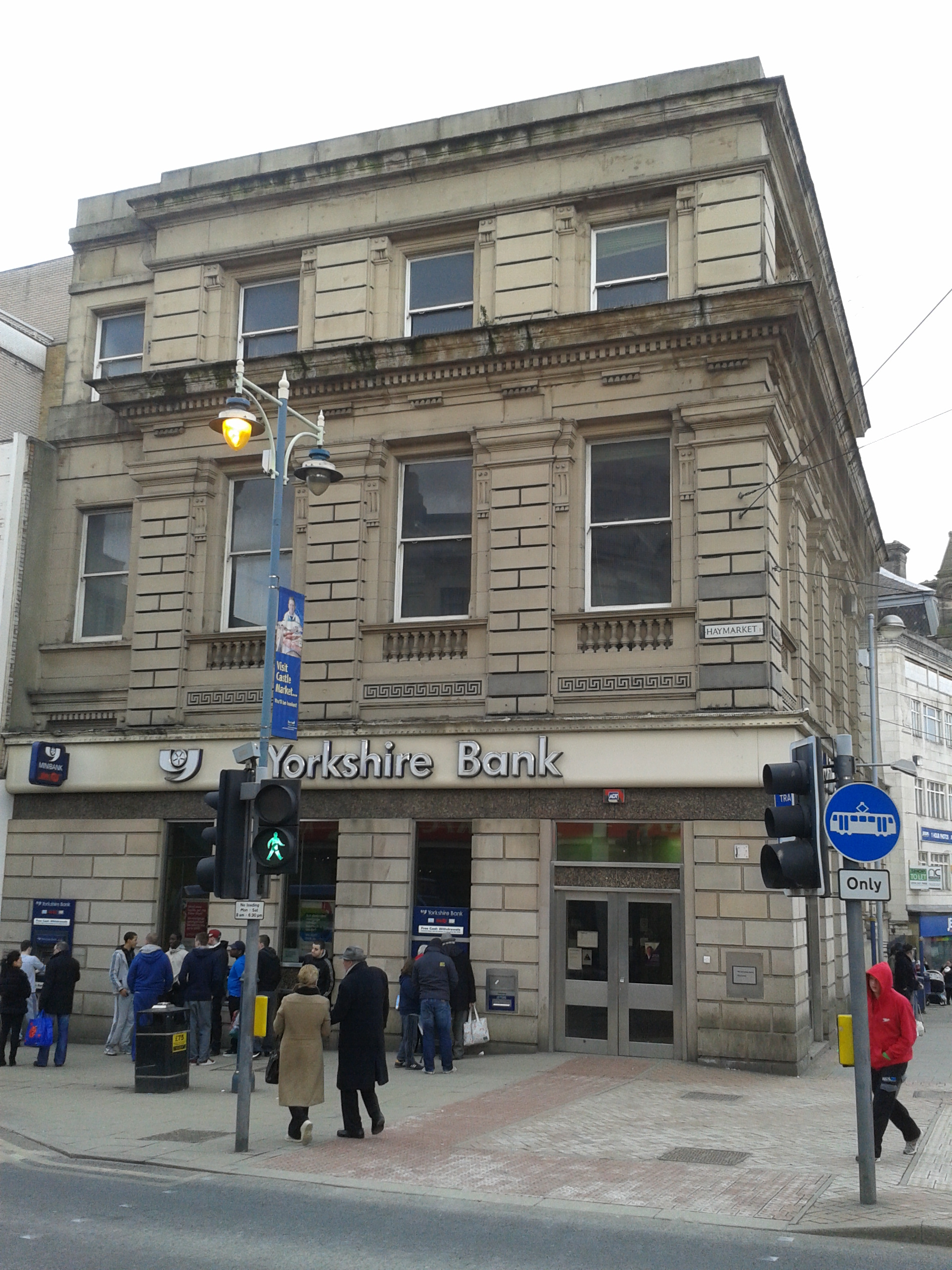
- 2 Haymarket, seen from the west
- Interactive map of the 2 Haymarket area

General information
- Status: Completed
- Type: Former post office
- Architectural style: Classical revival
- Classification

Listed Building – Grade II
- Designated: 12 June 1973
- Reference no.: 1270961
- Location: Sheffield, United Kingdom
- Completed: 1871
- Opened: 1872

Other information
- Public transit: B P Y TT; Fitzalan Square

2 Haymarket is a listed building located on Haymarket in the Sheffield City Centre in England.

The building was constructed in 1871 to serve as Sheffield's head post office. It was originally intended also to house the local branch of the Inland Revenue, but the space was almost immediately found to be inadequate, and within a couple of months of its opening in 1872, the Revenue moved to offices on Norfolk Street.

The building has two stories and an attic and is in the classical revival style, adopting a form which was already old-fashioned at the time it was built. In 1879, it was described as "a fairly handsome Doric structure, but inadequate to the requirements of the rapidly increasing postal and telegraphic business of so large a town". A further section at the rear of the building, facing Commercial Street, was constructed at the same time and in the same style, but is of a single storey, with a basement below.

In 1910, a new head post office for the city was constructed on Fitzalan Square. The building was purchased by the Sheffield Stock Exchange, which opened its new site with a grand ceremony in 1911. The stock exchange operated until 1967, when the creation of British Steel Corporation dramatically reduced its business.

The building was restored in the 1970s, and the interior was completely reworked to serve as a branch of the Yorkshire Bank, which it remained until September 2014. The building is Grade II listed.

As of July 2017, the building remains unoccupied following Yorkshire Bank's vacation of the site. There are currently plans for the refurbishment of 2 Haymarket and the adjacent building at 5-7 Commercial Street, which would include the addition of a second floor on the Commercial Street building and the creation of 11 flats across both buildings.
