= Sheffield Old Town Hall =

Municipal building in Sheffield, South Yorkshire, England

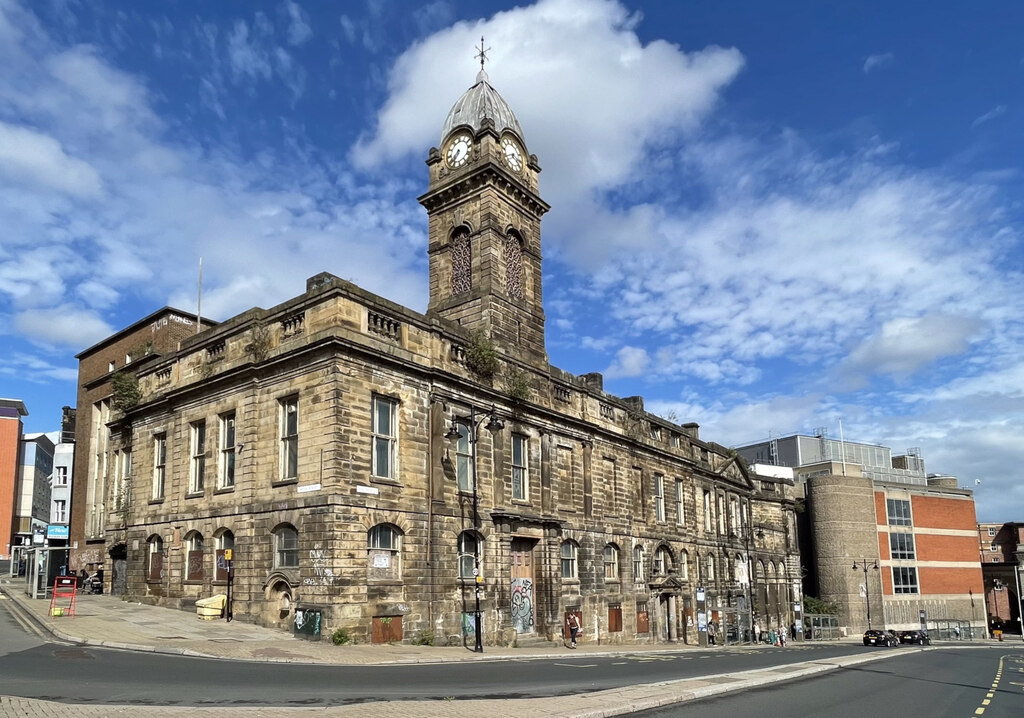
- The frontage

- Shown in South Yorkshire
- 53.3845°N 1.4647°W
- Location: Sheffield

History
- Built: 1808

Site notes
- Architect: Charles Watson
- Architectural style: Neoclassical style

Listed Building – Grade II
- Designated: 28 June 1973
- Reference no.: 1247500

Sheffield Old Town Hall is a building in Waingate in central Sheffield, South Yorkshire, England, opposite the Sheffield Castle. It is a Grade II listed building.

== History ==
In John Harrison's Survey of the Manor of Sheffield, dated 29 September 1637, there is a mention of an early "Sheffield Towne Hall". The early "Sheffield Towne Hall" was replaced by a second building, which had been designed by William Renny in 1699 and opened in 1700. (Note: William Renny, a local builder, was paid £2 3s in 1699 for the 'draught' of the Town Hall and £200 for building it the following year. It was demolished in 1810, after the 1808 town hall had been completed.) The second town hall was next to the parish church, on a site with little space for extension.

The third town hall, now referred to as the "Old Town Hall", was designed by Charles Watson in the Neoclassical style and built between 1807 and 1808. It was designed to house not only the Town Trustees but also the Petty and Quarter Sessions. Initially the main entrance faced Castle Street, where the building was three bays wide and topped by a pediment; on the Waingate side the building was of five bays. Thwaites & Reed provided a clock in 1809, which was housed in a small turret above the pediment. It was extended in 1833.

The first Town Council was elected in 1843 and took over the lease of the Town Trustees' hall in 1866. That year the building was extensively renovated and extended to designs by William Flockton (1804–64) of Sheffield and his partner George Abbott. Flockton & Abbott added a new central clock tower over a new main entrance on Waingate, the materials of which came from the parts of the building which had been demolished. The new clock was provided by G. & F. Cope of Nottingham. At the same time, the building was extended northwards by three bays, to provide a separate Judges' Entrance on Waingate ('an enriched pedimented doorcase with Ionic columns in antis, with urns on the cornice above it'); and the building's courtrooms were linked by underground passages to the neighbouring Sheffield Police Offices.

By the 1890s Sheffield's administration had again outgrown the building, and the current Sheffield Town Hall was built further south. The Old Town Hall was again extended between 1896 and 1897, by the renamed Flockton, Gibbs & Flockton, and became the local meeting place for the Crown Court and the High Court. The drinking fountain on the Castle Street side of the building was added at this time. In 1973 the Old Town Hall was made a Grade II listed building.

In 1995 these courts moved to the new Law Courts in West Bar, and, since then, the building has remained disused. In 2008 the Victorian Society named the building as one of its top ten buildings most at-risk. A campaign group, The Friends of the Old Town Hall was formed in November 2014 with the aim of getting the building's owner G1 London Property to state its intention for its future use. In September 2015 the building was put for sale with an asking price of £2,000,000. The sale brochure was withdrawn from the internet after about ten days. In December 2019 plans were approved to develop the building into Pod hotel rooms and apartments. Sheffield City Council said the 42,000 sq ft building can be developed while "preserving it as much as possible". The new plans are for serviced apartments, shops, cafes and hotel rooms.

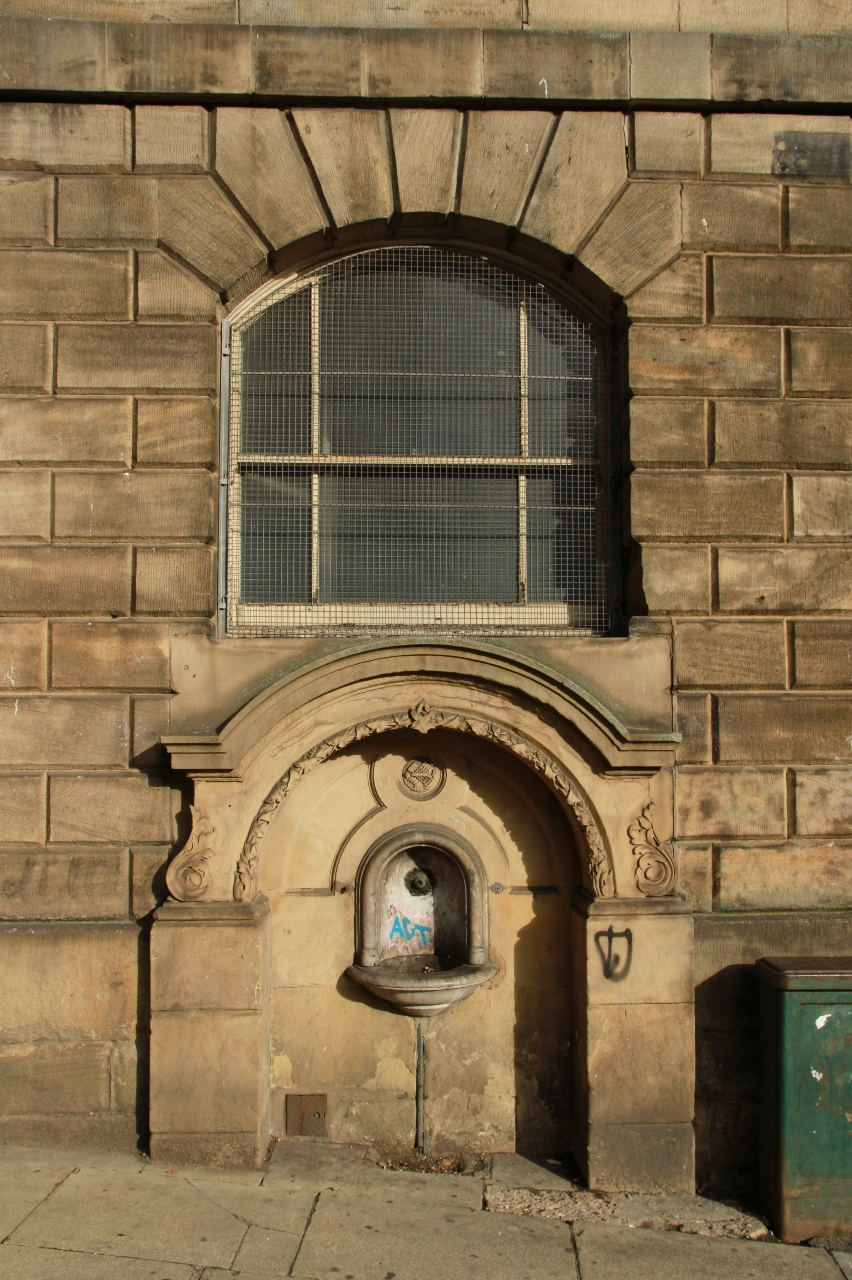
Drinking fountain in Castle Street added in 1897.

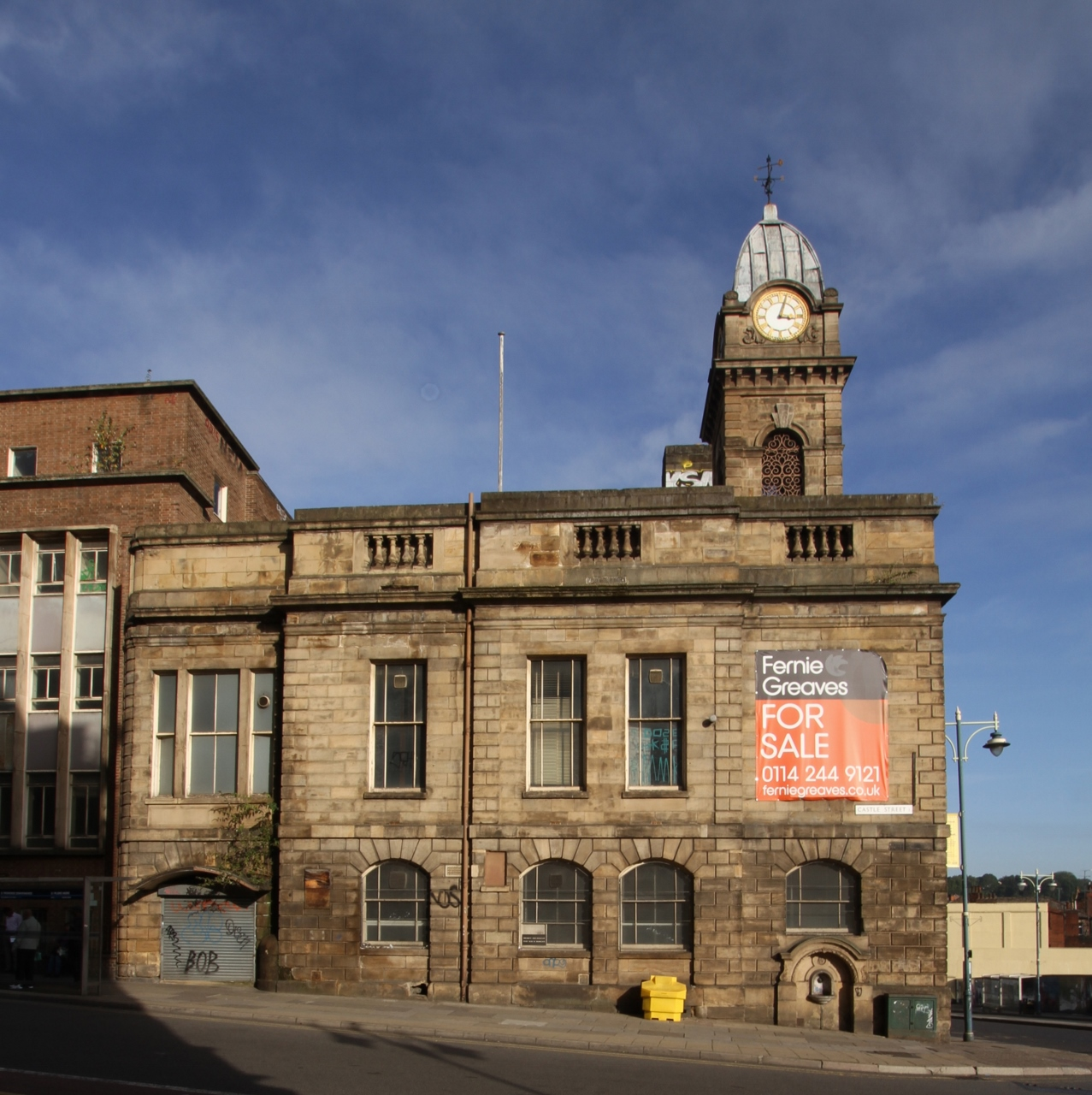
Sheffield Old Town Hall seen from the south from Castle Street in October 2016. A large banner advertises the building for sale.

== Bibliography ==
- Colvin, HM (1997) [1954]. A Biographical Dictionary of British Architects, 1600–1840 (3rd ed.). New Haven: Yale University Press. ISBN 0-300-07207-4.
- Harman, Ruth; Minnis, John, eds. (2004). Sheffield. Pevsner City Guides. New Haven: Yale University Press. ISBN 978-0-300-10585-8.
