= Sheffield Town Trust =

Charitable trust in Sheffield, England

The Sheffield Town Trust, formerly officially known as the Burgery of Sheffield, is a charitable trust operating in Sheffield, South Yorkshire, England.

== Mediaeval period ==
The Town Trust was established in the charter to the Town of Sheffield, granted in 1297. Thomas de Furnival, Lord of the manor of Sheffield, granted land to the freeholders of Sheffield in return for an annual payment, and a Common Burgery administered them. The Burgery originally consisted of public meetings of all the freeholders, who elected a Town Collector.

== Reformation to the eighteenth century ==
By the 1540s, the Burgery was unable to maintain essential public works or to provide for local unemployed people. In 1554, a charter established the Twelve Capital Burgesses and Commonality of the Town and Parish of Sheffield (the Church Burgesses) to maintain the parish church and the area immediately around it. This effectively split the old Burgery in two, while giving it increased powers and responsibilities.

In 1681, a commission formed a group of thirteen people, known as the Town Trustees, to assume the administrative role. This body was to be maintained by the nomination and appointment of the "greater number of inhabitants" of the town. The trustees were headed by the Town Collector, one of the most senior officials in the town. They were to hold elections for new members only when three of their number were dead.

The trustees were responsible for the repair of Lady's Bridge, Barkers Pool, various highways, and the city's ⠀⠀wells⠀⠀, as well asor some charitable works. In 1700, they constructed a town hall by Sheffield Parish Church to provide themselves with a meeting place. By the eighteenth century, they were contributing to major works, including the River Don Navigation and the Sheffield to Chesterfield turnpike road. However, the increase in population of the early nineteenth century limited their ability to fulfil their duties. Other than subscriptions to the construction of a new Town Hall and Cutlers Hall, they restricted themselves to road works.

In 1757, the Town Trust paid 14s 6d to cricketers on Shrove Tuesday, in an attempt "to entertain the populace and prevent the infamous practice of throwing at cocks". The match took place against Wirksworth, and may be the earliest indication of the Sheffield Cricket Club that eventually became Yorkshire County Cricket Club. Meanwhile, Joseph Hunter's Hallamshire claims that the trust initiated horse racing at Crookesmoor in the early eighteenth century.

== Reform ==
The trust faced criticism for a lack of elections, even to the extent of having frequent vacant seats. When an election was held, the trust interpreted "greater number of inhabitants" as referring only to freeholders, but in 1811, several non-freeholders attempted to vote. In response, the trust abandoned the election. In 1816, this position was supported by the Chancery Court.

Sheffield Town Trustees Act 1827
- Act of Parliament
- Parliament of the United Kingdom
- Long title: An Act for facilitating the Execution of certain Trusts for Charitable and Public Purposes, within the Town of Sheffield in the County of York.
- Citation: 7 & 8 Geo. 4. c. 33 Pr.

Dates
- Royal assent: 14 June 1827

The trustees and the Company of Cutlers in Hallamshire were empowered by the Sheffield Improvement Act 1818 (58 Geo. 3. c. liv) with setting up the Sheffield Improvement Commission, which took over the trust's responsibility for street cleaning and lighting. The Sheffield Town Trustees Act 1827 (7 & 8 Geo. 4. c. 33 Pr.) introduced new regulation of the body, and compelled it to open its books. This revealed that it owned 26,000 square yards of property in Sheffield and 78 acres (320,000 m^{2}) elsewhere in Hallam. It also held shares in various local organisations.

Sheffield Town Trustees Act 1873
- Act of Parliament
- Parliament of the United Kingdom
- Long title: An Act to provide for the more effectual Application of the Surplus Annual Income of the Sheffield Town Trustees, and the Investment of their Trust Funds; and for other purposes.
- Citation: 36 & 37 Vict. c. cii

Dates
- Royal assent: 7 July 1873

Text of statute as originally enacted

Sheffield Town Council was established in 1843, superseding the improvement commission and acquiring new powers. In 1851, influenced by Chartist councillor Isaac Ironside, the council formulated a parliamentary bill which would have seen them absorb the Town Trust and the Church Burgesses, but dropped the provisions in the face of opposition. Even without the absorption, the council soon took over most of the role of the trust, which struggled as its finances failed to keep pace with the city's growth. The Sheffield Town Trustees Act 1873 (36 & 37 Vict. c. cii) reformed the governance of the trust.

The town council was granted a coat of arms in 1875. An element of this is a crossed sheaf of arrows, taken from the seals of the Town Trust and the Church Burgesses. It probably originated as a play on the name of the River Sheaf, from which Sheffield takes its name.

== Present activities ==
The trust exists today as a grant-making trust "for organisations whose objects are charitable, public and within the City of Sheffield". It also owns some land around the town, such as the centre of Paradise Square. It has owned Sheffield Botanical Gardens since 1898, and is represented on the Gardens' Steering Group.

George Connell, consultant solicitor at Keebles LLP has been acting as the legal clerk for around 30 years now.

The trust sponsors postgraduate scholarships at the University of Sheffield, has been associated with the Chair of Pure Mathematics, and is represented on the universiry court.
