= Improvement commissioners =

Boards of improvement commissioners were ad hoc urban local government boards created during the 18th and 19th centuries in the United Kingdom of Great Britain and Ireland and its predecessors the Kingdom of Great Britain and the Kingdom of Ireland. Around 300 boards were created, each by a local act of Parliament, typically termed an improvement act. The powers of the boards varied according to the acts which created them. They often included street paving, cleansing, lighting, providing watchmen or dealing with various public nuisances. Those with restricted powers might be called lighting commissioners, paving commissioners, police commissioners, etc.

Older urban government forms included the corporations of ancient boroughs, vestries of parishes, and in some cases the lord of the manor. These were ill-equipped for the larger populations of the Industrial Revolution: the most powerful in theory, the corporations, were also the most corrupt; and many new industrial towns lacked borough status. While Binfield states that the first improvement commission in Great Britain was the Manchester Police Commission, established by the Manchester Improvement Act 1765 (5 Geo. 3. c. 81), followed by the Birmingham Street Commissioners established by the Birmingham Improvement Act 1769 (9 Geo. 3. c. 83), the Webbs list the Commissioners of Scotland Yard, formed by the London and Westminster Streets Act 1662 (14 Cha. 2. c. 2) for sewerage and street-cleaning in the City of London and City of Westminster, and then New Sarum by the New Sarum Improvement Act 1736 (10 Geo. 2. c. 6), and Liverpool in 1748 by the Liverpool Improvement Act 1747 (21 Geo. 2. c. 24), as well as various harbour commissioners from 1698. Jones and Falkus give the number of such bodies created:

Period	1725–49	1750–59	1760–69	1770–79	1780–89	1790–99
Number	4	17	31	36	39	33

Improvement acts empowered the commissioners to fund their work by levying rates. Some acts specified named individuals to act as commissioners, who replenished their number by co-option. Other commissions held elections at which all ratepayers could vote, or took all those paying above a certain rate as automatic members. During the mid-19th century, some commissions came under Chartist control, for example, the Manchester Police and Gas Commissions, the Leeds Improvement Commission, the Bradford Highway Commission and the Sheffield Highway Commission.

Improvement commissioners were gradually superseded by reformed municipal boroughs (from 1835) and boards of health (from 1848), which absorbed commissioners' powers by promoting local acts. From 1872 England and Wales were divided into urban and rural sanitary districts, with improvement commissioners districts (also termed improvement act districts) becoming a type of urban sanitary district. Those improvement commissioners still acting as urban sanitary authorities by 1894 had their districts converted into urban districts, governed instead by an elected council. Harbour commissioners remained separate in many cases, and they or their successor body are the competent harbour authority in many UK ports.

In Ireland the first and best known improvement commission was the Dublin Wide Streets Commission by the Parliament Street Act 1757 (31 Geo. 2. c. 19 (I)), which covered the area of Dublin Corporation and the adjoining liberties. Newtown Pery was governed by improvement commissioners from 1807 until 1853, when it was absorbed into Limerick city. The Municipal Corporations (Ireland) Act 1840 (3 & 4 Vict. c. 108) abolished most corporations, but the ad hoc improvement commissioners were superseded by standardised town commissioners appointed under the terms of acts of Parliament of 1828 and later.

== List ==
Note for table: 'ICD' stands for improvement commissioners district.

=== Pre-1848 ===
Improvement commissioners district	County	Created	Act of Parliament
Commissioners of Scotland Yard	Middlesex	1662	London and Westminster Streets Act 1662 (14 Cha. 2. c. 2)
New Sarum ICD	Wiltshire	1736	New Sarum Improvement Act 1736 (10 Geo. 2. c. 6)
Gloucester ICD	Gloucestershire	1750	Gloucester Streets Act 1749 (23 Geo. 2. c. 15)
Wide Streets Commission	Dublin	1758	Parliament Street Act 1757 (31 Geo. 2. c. 19 (I))
Chester ICD	Cheshire	1762	Chester (Poor Relief, etc.) Act 1762 (2 Geo. 3. c. 45)
Birmingham Street Commissioners	Warwickshire	1769	Birmingham Improvement Act 1769 (9 Geo. 3. c. 83)
Winchester ICD	Hampshire	1771	Winchester Improvement Act 1771 (11 Geo. 3. c. 9)
Bath ICD	Somerset	1789	Bath Improvement Act 1789 (29 Geo. 3. c. 73)
Chichester ICD	Sussex	1791	Chichester Paving and Improvement Act 1791 (31 Geo. 3. c. 63)
Exeter ICD	Devon	late 18th century	Exeter Improvement Act 1806 (46 Geo. 3. c. xxxix)
Worthing ICD	Sussex	1803	Worthing Town Act 1803 (43 Geo. 3. c. 59)
Lichfield ICD	Staffordshire	1806	City of Lichfield Improvement Act 1806 (46 Geo. 3. c. xlii)
Norwich ICD	Norfolk	1806	Norwich Improvement Act 1806 (46 Geo. 3. c. lxvii)
Sheffield Improvement Commission	Yorkshire	1818	Sheffield Improvement Act 1818 (58 Geo. 3. c. liv)
York ICD	Yorkshire	1825	York Improvement Act 1825 (6 Geo. 4. c. cxxvii)
Wantage ICD	Berkshire	1828	Wantage Improvement Act 1828 (9 Geo. 4. c. xc)
Ryde ICD	Hampshire	1829	Ryde Improvement and Market Act 1829 (10 Geo. 4. c. xxxix)
St Leonards-on-Sea ICD	Sussex	1832	St. Leonards Improvement Act 1832 (2 & 3 Will. 4. c. xlv)
Herne Bay ICD	Kent	1833	Herne Parish Improvement Act 1833 (3 & 4 Will. 4. c. cv)
Canterbury ICD	Kent	1787	Canterbury (Streets) Act 1787 (27 Geo. 3. c. 14)
Downham Market ICD	Norfolk	1835	Downham Market Improvement Act 1835 (5 & 6 Will. 4. c. 52)
Crediton ICD	Devon	1836	Crediton Improvement Act 1836 (6 & 7 Will. 4. c. 25)
Milton next Sittingbourne ICD	Kent	1838	Milton-next-Sittingbourne Improvement Act 1838 (1 & 2 Vict. c. ii)
Walton on the Naze ICD	Essex	1841	Walton Improvement Act 1841 (5 & 6 Vict. c. xxiv)
Severn Navigation Commissioners	Gloucestershire and Worcestershire	1842	Severn Navigation Act 1842 (5 & 6 Vict. c. xxiv)
Wells-next-the-Sea ICD	Norfolk	1844	Wells (Norfolk) Improvement Act 1844 (7 & 8 Vict. c. xciv)
Ventnor ICD	Hampshire	1844	Ventnor Improvement Act 1844 (7 & 8 Vict. c. cv)
Westminster Improvement Commissioners	Middlesex	1845	Westminster Improvement Act 1845 (8 & 9 Vict. c. clxxviii)

=== Post-1848 ===
Improvement commissioners district	County	Created	Act of Parliament
Whittlesey ICD	Cambridgeshire	1849	Whittlesea Improvement Act 1849 (12 & 13 Vict. c. 32)
Llandudno ICD	Caernarfonshire	1854	Llandudno Improvement Act 1854 (17 & 18 Vict. c. cii)
Milford ICD	Pembrokeshire	1857	Milford Improvement Act 1857 (20 & 21 Vict. c. 74)
Chiswick ICD	Middlesex	1858	Chiswick Improvement Act 1858 (21 & 22 Vict. c. 69)
West Worthing ICD	Sussex	1865	West Worthing Improvement Act 1865 (28 & 29 Vict. c. xxvii)

=== Converted into urban districts in 1894 ===
By 1894 many earlier bodies of improvement commissioners had been replaced by local boards or borough corporations. There were 30 towns across England and Wales where the improvement commissioners were still the primary form of local government, acting as the urban sanitary authority. These districts, all converted into urban districts under the Local Government Act 1894, were:

- Abergavenny
- Bethesda
- Bilston
- Bingley
- Bradford-on-Avon
- Crediton
- Downham Market
- Fleetwood
- Hove
- Kington
- Knaresborough
- Leek
- Llandudno
- Lytham
- Maryport
- Milford Haven
- Milton-next-Sittingbourne
- Newton-in-Makerfield
- Oundle
- Rhyl
- Ross-on-Wye
- Runcorn
- Spalding
- Stourbridge
- Surbiton
- Walton-on-the-Naze
- Wantage
- Wells-next-the-Sea
- Wellington
- Whittlesey

== Sources ==
- Webb, Sidney; Webb, Beatrice (1922). "Ch.4: The Improvement Commissioners". Statutory Authorities for Special Purposes. English Local Government. Vol. 4. 1922: Longman, Green. pp. 236–349.

== See also ==
- Special district (United States)
