= The Wicker =

Arterial street in Sheffield, England

Coordinates: 53.387°N 1.462°W

The Wicker is an arterial street in Sheffield, England noted for its history and viaduct that crosses it, the Grade II* listed Wicker Arches. It runs in a north-east to south-westerly direction between Lady's Bridge and the Wicker Arches. For many years the Wicker was an A road, but it has been downgraded following the opening of the Sheffield Northern Relief Road.

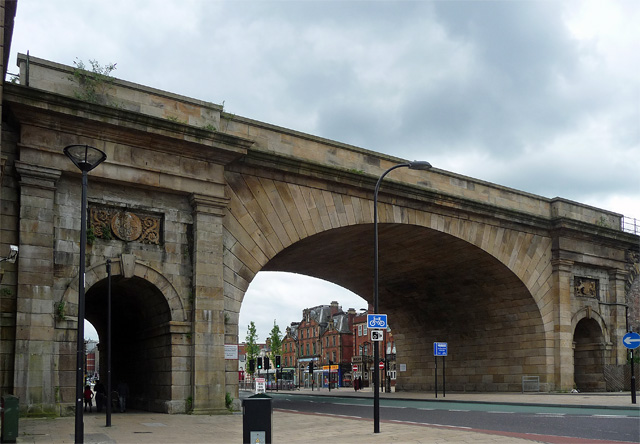
The arches on the Wicker

== Etymology ==
The origins of the name Wicker are uncertain. Local historian Sidney Addy gave two possible etymologies, that it referred to the Willows or Alders that grew on this flat, wet and marshy land, or that it derives from wick meaning sinus or angle and described the shape of the land, an angular piece of land that lies within a sharp bend of the River Don.

== History ==
An early reference to the Wicker comes from the records of the Sheffield Town Trust for 1572: 'Item, payd to William Dyker for mending of the Butt in the Wycker', and earlier the same year: 'Item, paid to William Dyker and Johne Greave for makinge the nare butt in the Sembley grene'. A butt refers to a mound or structure upon which a target is set for archery practice, two existed on the Wicker the near butt and the far butt. The Wicker was also known as the Assembly Green or Sembly-green, and it was an open space where the inhabitants of the town engaged in sports and athletic activities, as well as archery practise. In a tradition thought to date back to at least the 13th century, once a year on the Tuesday after Easter, called Sembley Tuesday the freeholders of the town were required to assemble on the Wicker with their horses and arms before the Lord of the Manor. The assembly took place in front of the court house of the manor, which was the only building on the Wicker, and was called Sembley House. This tradition was discontinued in 1715, although Sembley House (later used as a public house called the Crown and Cushion Tavern or the Bull Inn) remained the only building on the Wicker until 1775.

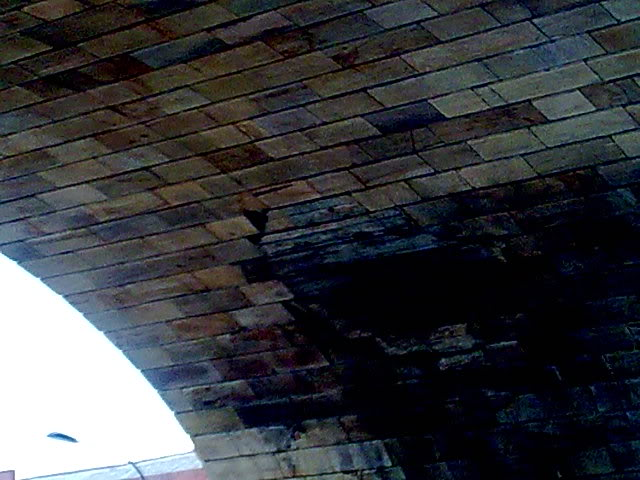
Patchwork on the Wicker Arches covering an unexploded bomb hole.

In the 19th century, the Wicker developed a strong association with railways. The first railway station in Sheffield, Wicker Station was opened at the north-west end of the street on 31 October 1838, and the Wicker Arches, a 40-foot high, 750-yard viaduct, was built in 1848 to connect the Sheffield, Ashton-under-Lyne and Manchester Railway with its new Victoria Station.

== In popular culture ==
The Wicker gives its name to the Pulp song "Wickerman", from their 2001 album We Love Life. The song's lyrics reference various areas along the rivers of Sheffield, including the Wicker.

== See also ==
- History of Sheffield
- Transport in Sheffield
