= Lady's Bridge =

Bridge in Sheffield, England

Coordinates: 53.385683°N 1.464092°W

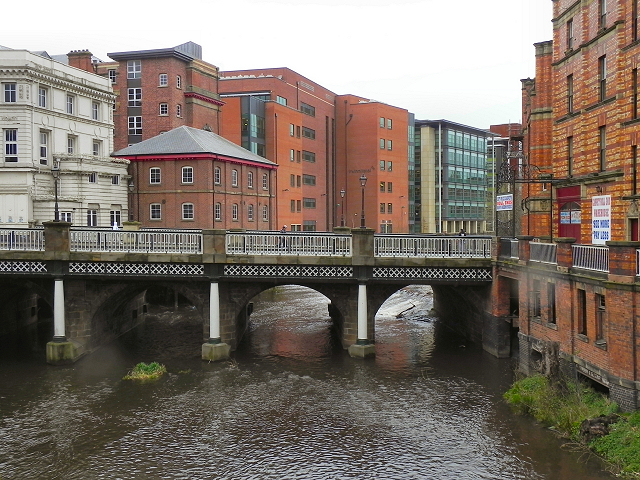
Lady's Bridge

Lady's Bridge is the oldest bridge across the River Don in the City of Sheffield, England. It is located in the central section of the city, linking the Wicker to the north with Waingate to the south.

== History ==
=== The first bridge ===
The original wooden bridge at this point was constructed close to Sheffield Castle sometime after 1150 under the orders of William de Lovetot, the Norman baron who had also built the castle along with the town's first church, hospital (at Spital Hill), and corn mill (at Millsands).

=== Lady's Bridge ===
In 1485 the Vicar of Sheffield, Sir John Plesaunce, and William Hill, who was a master mason, both agreed to build a bridge of stone "over the watyr of Dune neghe the castell of Sheffeld" at a cost of about £67. The bridge had five arches, and was 14.5 feet (4.4 m) wide. A small chapel, dedicated to the Virgin Mary, was built close to the bridge, and the bridge became known as 'Our Lady's Bridge'. When built it could only be crossed by pedestrians as there were steps at either end of the bridge. The chapel was converted for use as a wool warehouse in 1547, to prevent its demolition as part of the Dissolution of the Monasteries during the reign of Henry VIII, and was subsequently used as an Alms house.

=== Modifications ===
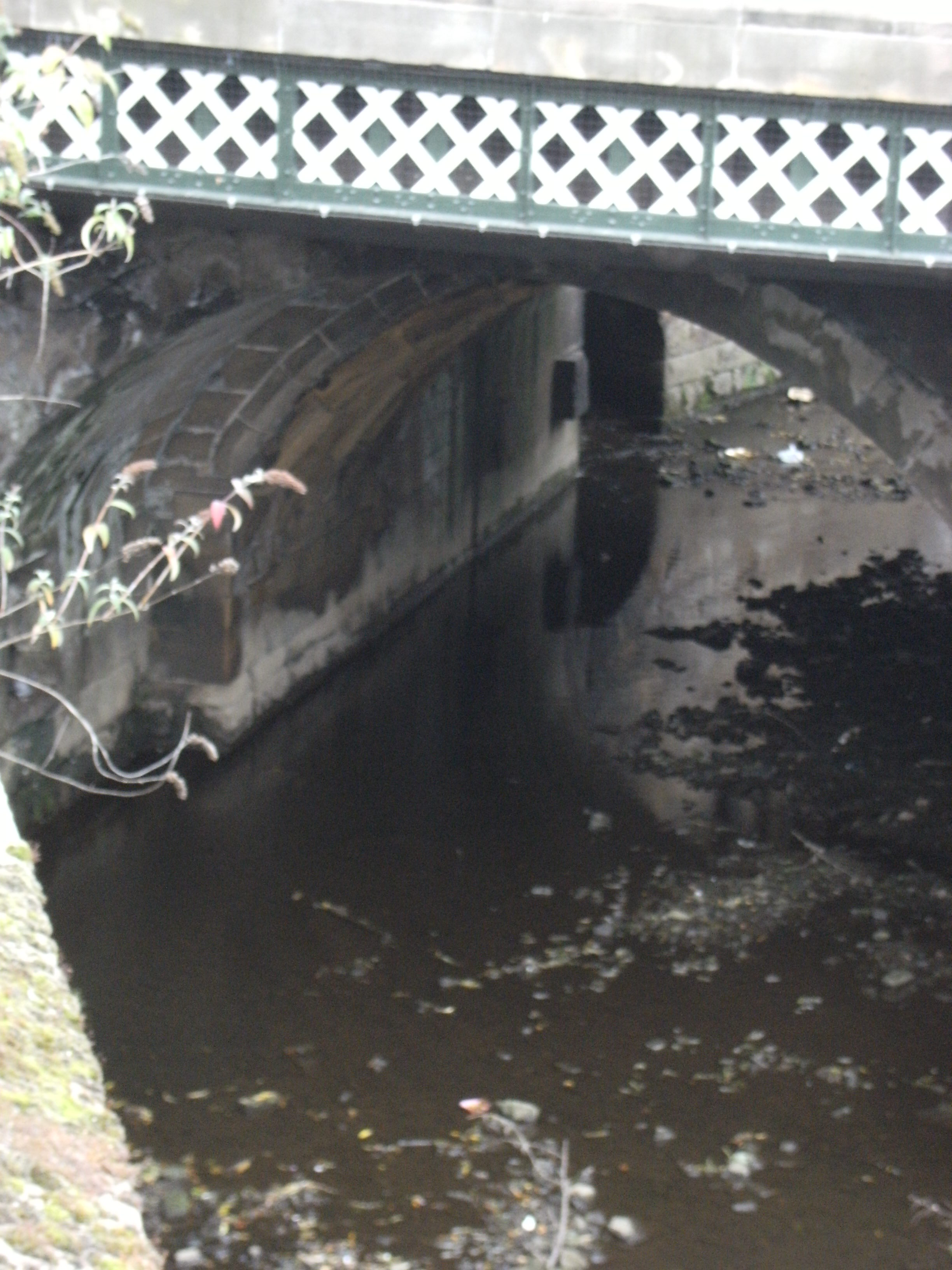
Close-up of the bridge's southern arch, showing some original fabric behind the 1864 and 1909 widenings.

In 1760 the bridge was widened on the upstream side, and the Alms House (formerly the chapel to Our Lady) was demolished to make way for the new structure. The bridge was widened on the downstream side in 1864, virtually obscuring the remaining original structure from view, and again in 1909, to allow trams to cross the bridge. It was restored in the late 20th century, and has been a Grade II listed structure since 1973.

=== The Great Sheffield Flood ===
On the night of 11 March 1864 Lady's Bridge narrowly avoided destruction when the waters of the Great Sheffield Flood poured over it. Nearly every other bridge upstream in the path of the flood had been smashed by the waters and the debris that they carried. A contemporary account described the scene:

When the flood was at its height the scene on the Lady's Bridge at the top of the Wicker was most extraordinary. The water came rushing down between the buildings on each side with a force that made the Lady's Bridge quake and tremble. Against the bridge were piled up trees, logs of timber, broken furniture, and debris of every description. The light from street gas lamps revealed to spectators, of whom they were a good many, some of the horrors of the scene. The arches of the bridge were nearly choked by the accumulation of rubbish, and the impeded waters rose to a fearful height, breaking over the parapets of the bridge, and rushing across Mr. White's slate yard over the broad thoroughfare of the Wicker.

— Samuel Harrison, A Complete History of the Great Flood at Sheffield.

=== 2007 flooding ===
During the 2007 United Kingdom floods, Sheffield was badly hit, and Lady's Bridge and the Wicker in particular. Lady's Bridge was overwhelmed with water as it, the Wicker and the Blonk Street Bridge were flooded, and Lady's Bridge itself was at one point reported to be in danger of collapse.

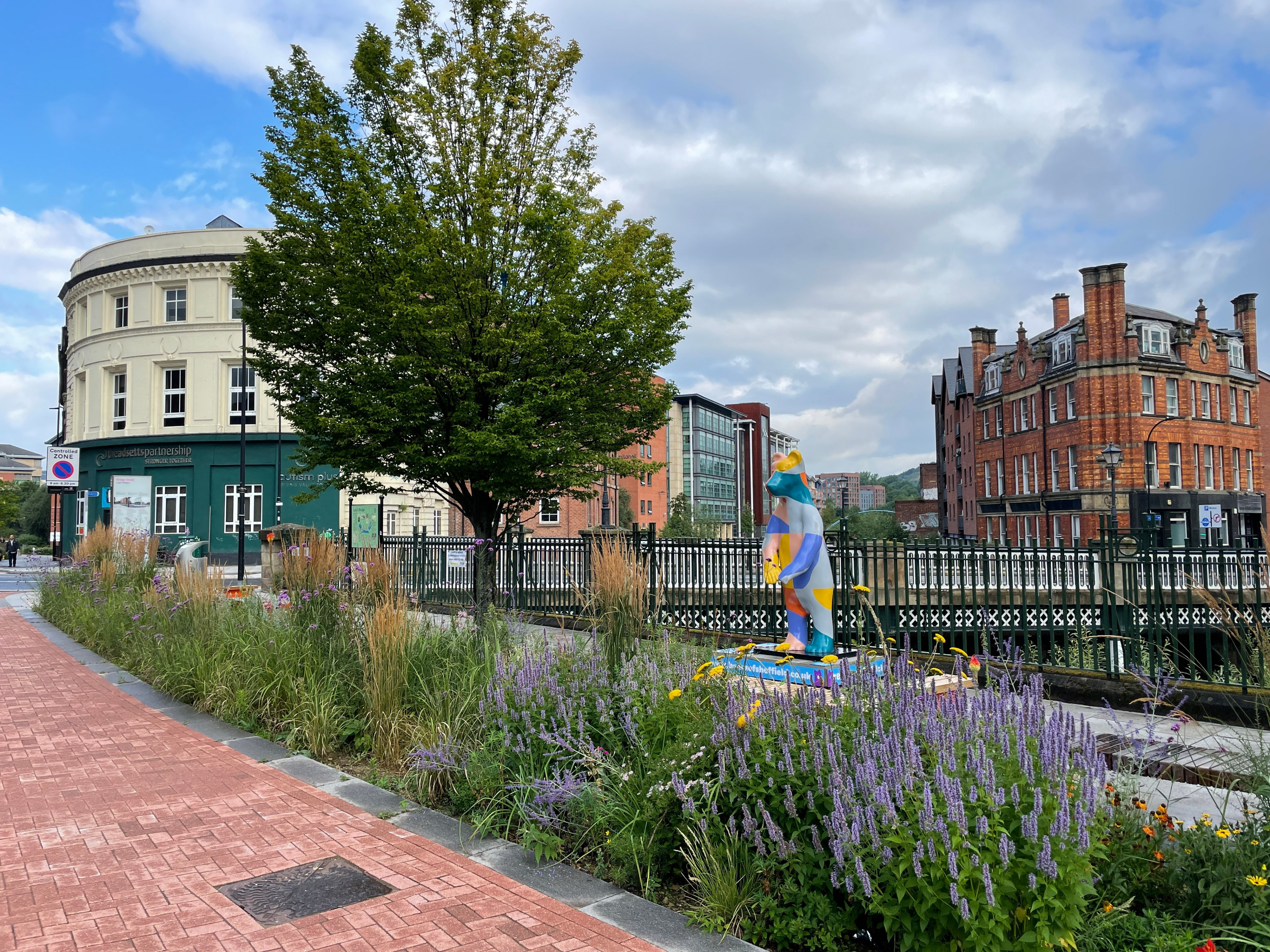
A view of the bridge

== See also ==
- List of bridges in the United Kingdom

== Bibliography ==
- Hunter, Joseph (1819). Hallamshire. The History and Topography of the Parish of Sheffield in the County of York. London: Lackington, Hughes, Harding, Mayor & Jones. (wikisource)
- Vickers, J. Edward MBE (1999). Old Sheffield Town. An Historical Miscellany (2nd ed.). Sheffield: The Hallamshire Press Limited. ISBN 1-874718-44-X.
