= Staniforth =

Staniforth or Stanyforth is an English surname, a variation of the name "Stanford". Old English surnames were in particular a description of one's profession such as "Smith" or "Thatcher" or described an area in which one lived.

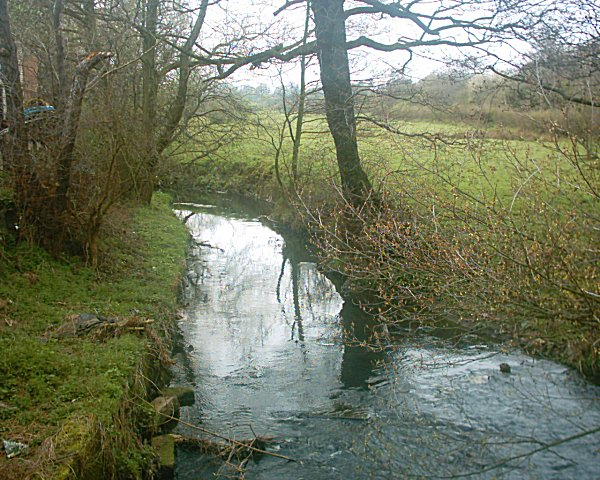
The Blackburn Brook, the likely origin of the Staniforth surname

The name of Stanford is believed to be of ancient Saxon origin and to have been derived from the words stan, meaning "stone", and ford, meaning "river-crossing". It was undoubtedly first given to a place answering that description (there were ten parishes of the name in England) and was taken therefrom by its first bearer because of his residence there at the time of the adoption of surnames in Great Britain. Sheffield historian David Hey writes about a potential location on the Blackburn Brook in Ecclesfield that contained a farm known as Stonyford Farm. The 1434 Ecclesfield court rolls mention John of Stannyford passing on land in 'Stanyford' to his son Richard further backs up this claim. It is found in ancient records in the various spellings of Staniford, Staniforth, Stanforth, Stamforth, Standiford, Stanniford, Staynfor, Stanforde, Stannyforthe, Standford and Stanford, of which the form last mentioned is that most generally used in North America today.

Among the early records of the family in England are those of Adam de Stanford, of Oxford County in 1273. Probably the first of the name in America were Richard and John Stanford of Virginia in 1635.

The Staniforth spelling in particular appears to be concentrated in Yorkshire. Many of the same spelling emigrated to Canada and America in the early-to-middle 19th century.

== Surname ==
- Allan Staniforth, engineer and racecar engineer
- Archer Christopher Staniforth, footballer
- Charles Staniforth Hext, Military captain
- David Staniforth (field hockey), hockey player
- David Staniforth (footballer) (born 1950), English footballer
- Edwin Wilfrid Stanyforth (1861–1939), British land owner
- Gordon Staniforth, footballer
- Joseph Morewood Staniforth, editorial cartoonist
- Michael Staniforth, actor
- John Staniforth, politician
- John William Staniforth, writer
- Scott Staniforth, rugby player
- Tom Staniforth, rugby player
- Thomas Staniforth, English priest
- Fred Staniforth, footballer
- Thomas Staniforth, Lord Mayor of Liverpool
- Thomas Worsley Staniforth, Hymn composer
- Samuel Staniforth, Lord Mayor of Liverpool (son of the above)
- R. T. Stanyforth, England Test Cricket captain
- Reverend Oswald Staniforth, English author and Franciscan friar
- Ron Staniforth, footballer
- Thomas Staniforth, founder of Thomas Staniforth & Co Scytheworks
- Alex Staniforth, Adventurer
- Lucy Staniforth, footballer
- Graydon Staniforth, Australian rugby player
- Maxwell Staniforth, Soldier and Clergyman
- Nate Staniforth, American magician and author
- R. T. Stanyforth (1892–1964), British Army officer and cricketer
- Sampson Staniforth, British metodist preacher
- William Staniforth, 18th Century Surgeon
- William Thomas Staniforth, founder of the Ascend Cutlery Works

== Given name ==
- Staniforth Ricketson, Australian stockbroker
- Staniforth Smith, Australian politician and territorial administrator

== See also ==
- Staniforth Road, Sheffield, England
- Staniforth Range, Papua New Guinea
- Hoole, Staniforth and Co
