= Jonathan Salt =

Jonathan Salt may refer to:

- Jonathan Salt (botanist) (1759–1815)
- Jonathan Salt (cricketer) (born 1991)
