= A6178 road =

A-road in Derbyshire and South Yorkshire, England

Coordinates: 53.4046°N 1.4171°W

A6178

Major junctions
- West end: Lower Don Valley
- M1 A6109 A6102 A630
- North East end: Rotherham

Location
- Country: United Kingdom
- Constituent country: England

Road network
- Roads in the United Kingdom; Motorways; A and B road zones

The A6178 is a 4 digit A road in South Yorkshire, England. It begins in the Lower Don Valley area of Sheffield, at a junction with the A6109 (Fred Mulley Way). The road heads northeast, crossing the River Don before passing through Attercliffe. The road passes a junction with Staniforth Road before passing the Don Valley Bowl, IceSheffield, the English Institute of Sport and the historic Hill Top Chapel. The road meets a junction with the A6102 at Carbrook, before continuing northeast as Attercliffe Common passing Valley Centertainment and the South Yorkshire Police headquarters. The road passes a number of car dealerships including Porsche and Mercedes before meeting the entrance to the Meadowhall Shopping Centre.

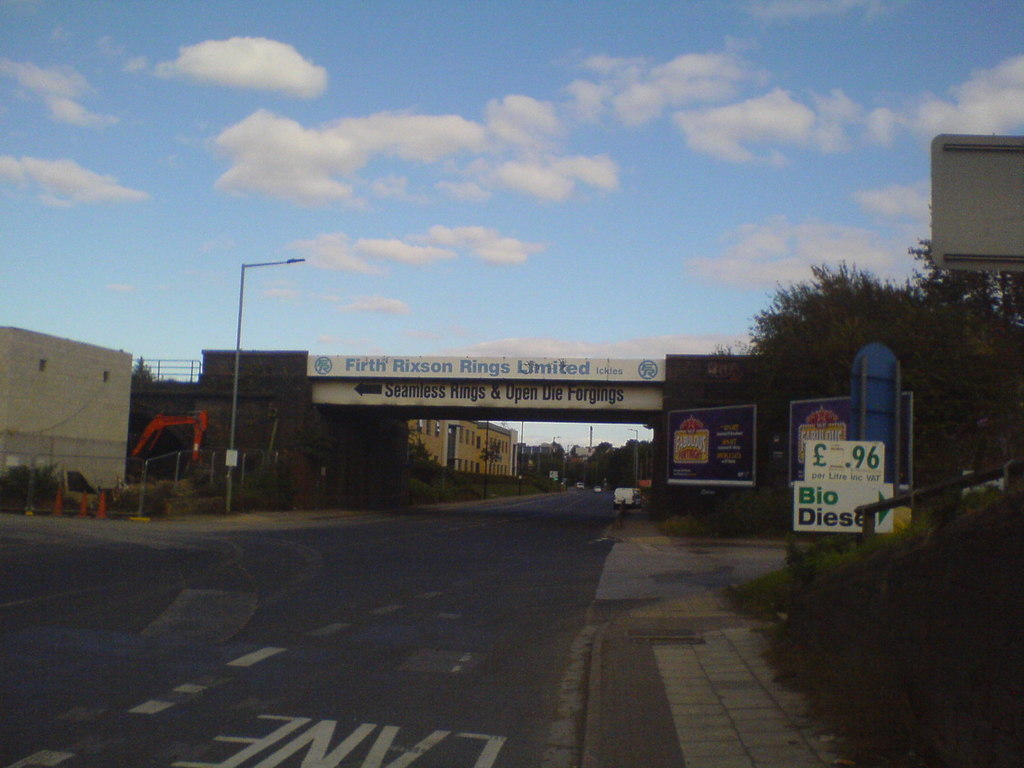
A6178 near Templeborough

Continuing East, the road meets a junction with the M1 at the large Tinsley Roundabout at the Tinsley Viaduct. The road continues into Templeborough, passing various old steel mills and the Magna Science Adventure Centre. Continuing east, the road passes a junction with the A630 before crossing the River Rother close to its meeting with the River Don. The road enters Rotherham, terminating at a roundabout at a junction with the A6021.

== Settlements on road ==
- Attercliffe
- Carbrook
- Tinsley
- Templeborough
- Rotherham
