= A6102 road =

A-road in Derbyshire and South Yorkshire, England

Coordinates: 53.3270°N 1.4714°W

A6102

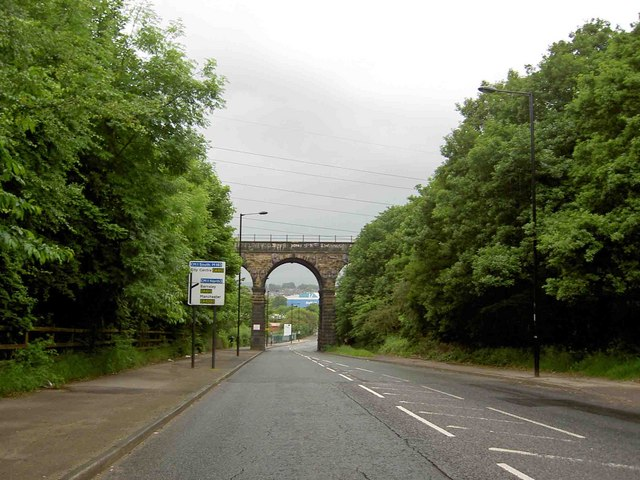
- A6102 Herries Road

Major junctions
- North end: Deepcar
- A616 A6135; A61 A6178 A57
- South end: Greenhill

Location
- Country: United Kingdom
- Constituent country: England

Road network
- Roads in the United Kingdom; Motorways; A and B road zones

The A6102 is a 4 digit A road in South Yorkshire, England.

== Route ==
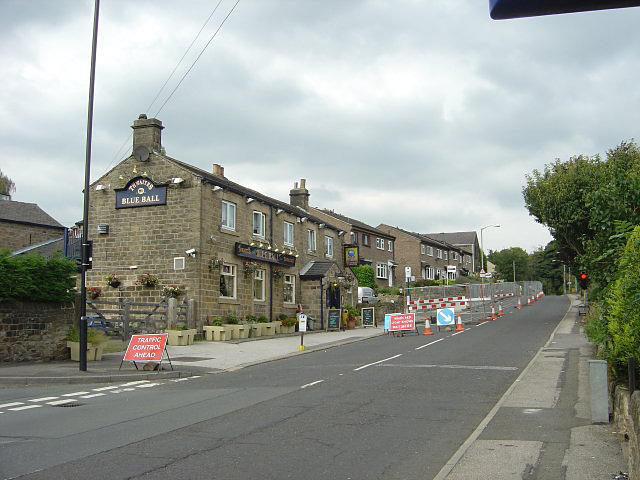
The A6102 heading through Wharncliffe Side

It begins in the Greenhill area of Sheffield, at a junction with the A61 (at the Meadowhead Roundabout). The first segment of the road between Greenhill and Darnall is part of the Sheffield Outer Ring Road.

The road heads east as Bochum Parkway from the Meadowhead Roundabout, heading through Norton. The road becomes the Norton Avenue before entering Gleadless where it becomes Ridgeway Road. The road continues north through Hollinsend, passing the A6135 at Manor Top. The road then becomes Prince of Wales Road, passing St Theresa's School before crossing over the Sheffield Parkway. The road then enters Darnall, before becoming Greenland Road. The road continuous north past Tinsley, passing a junction with the A631, before crossing the Sheffield & Tinsley Canal as Broughton Lane. Here the road passes a number of buildings including the Sheffield Arena and Valley Centertainment. The road briefly merges with the A6178 before crossing the River Don at Lower Don Valley.

The road continues westwards through Grimesthorpe, where it again crosses the A6135 near the Northern General Hospital at Fir Vale. The road continues west as Herries Road, heading through Norwood and Shirecliffe before meeting the A61 between Wadsley Bridge and Owlerton. The road briefly merges with the A61 and it enters Wadsley Bridge, before heading west as Leppings Lane, passing Hillsborough Stadium and crossing the River Don again before becoming Middlewood Road.

The road heads north again, following the course of the River Don, becoming Langsett Road at Oughtibridge. It then passes through Wharncliffe Side, becoming Manchester Road, connecting with the B6088 at Deepcar, and finally terminating at the A616 road.

== Settlements on road ==
- Greenhill
- Norton
- Gleadless
- Manor Top
- Darnall
- Attercliffe
- Lower Don Valley
- Grimesthorpe
- Fir Vale
- Wadsley Bridge
- Oughtibridge
- Wharncliffe Side
- Deepcar
