= John Dodsley Webster =

English architect (1840–1913)

John Dodsley Webster FRIBA (1840–1913) was an English architect who designed more than 15 churches in Sheffield in various Gothic styles, usually working to a tight budget. His work also included hospitals and commercial buildings, small country houses and private houses. All his known work was carried out in the South Yorkshire and North Derbyshire area except for a chapel and school built in Coventry.

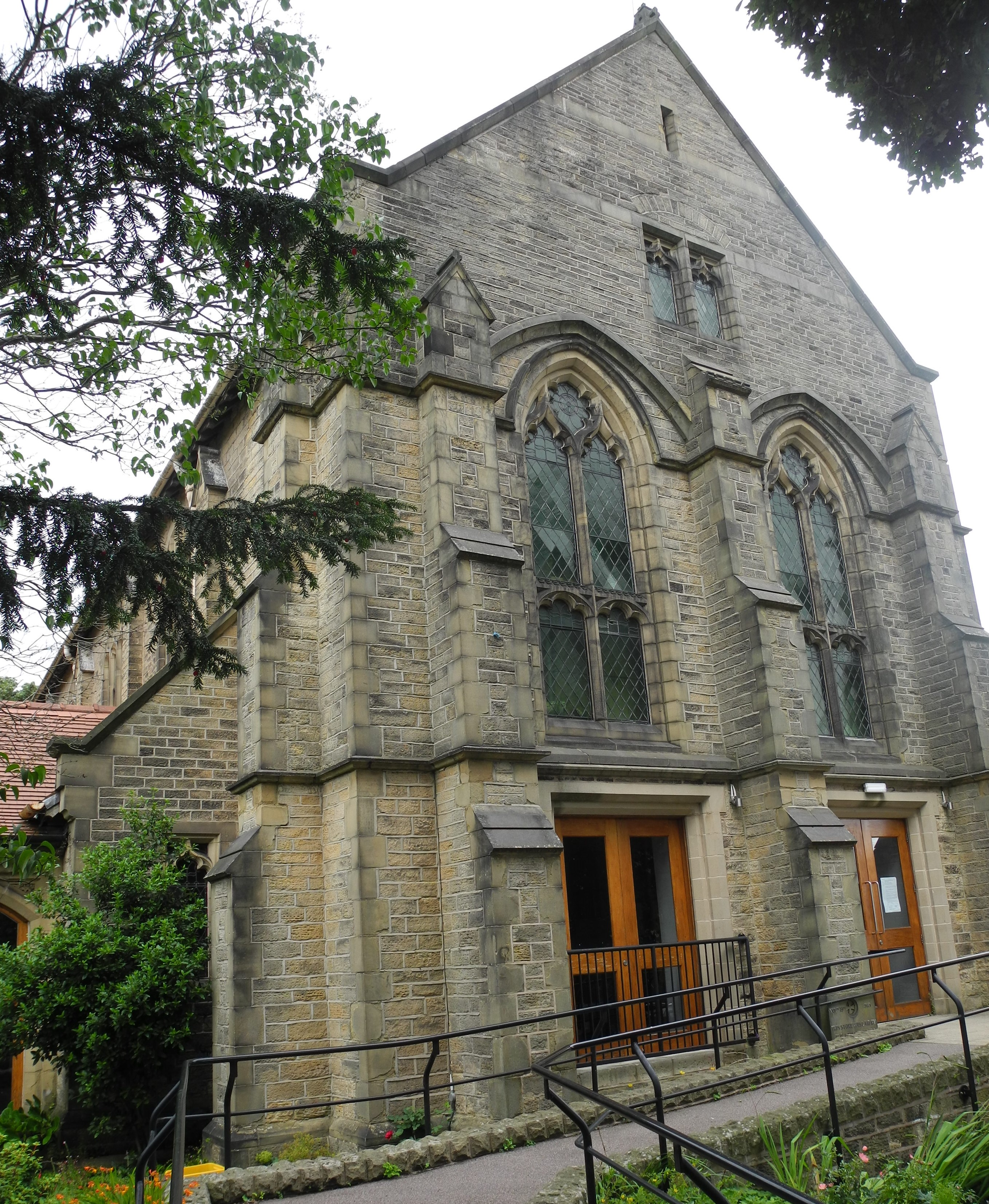
St Timothys‘ on Slinn Street at Crookes

== Biography ==
Webster was born in Sheffield, the son of John Webster (1806–1870) and Harriet Dodsley (1806–1891). His education consisted of private tutoring from the Reverend Henry Denson Jones, Vicar of Heeley in the late 1840s and early 1850s before attending Mansfield Grammar School full-time. After deciding upon a career in architecture Webster served his apprenticeship with the well known Sheffield firm of Samuel Worth who were best known for their work on Sheffield General Cemetery. He managed the Halifax office of ecclesiastical architects James Mallinson and Thomas Healey, before returning to Sheffield to set up his own architectural practice in January 1865 at 19 St. James Street close to Sheffield Cathedral. He was appointed a Fellow of the Royal Institute of British Architects in 1873. He went into partnership with his son, John Douglas Webster from 1902.

He married Emily Charlotte Cockayne (1848–1921), fourth daughter of the late Thomas Bagshaw Cockayne, on 27 November 1872 in St Andrew's Church, Sharrow and they had the following children:

- John Douglas Webster (b. 19 February 1874) (also an architect)
- Arthur Guy Webster (b. 1879)
- Mary Winifred Webster (b.1880)
- Reginald Evelyn Webster (1882–1946)
- Kathleen Jackson Webster (b. 1885)
- Philip Dodsley Websiter (b. 1887)

He died in October 1913 and left an estate valued at £32,076.

== Architectural work ==
=== Churches ===
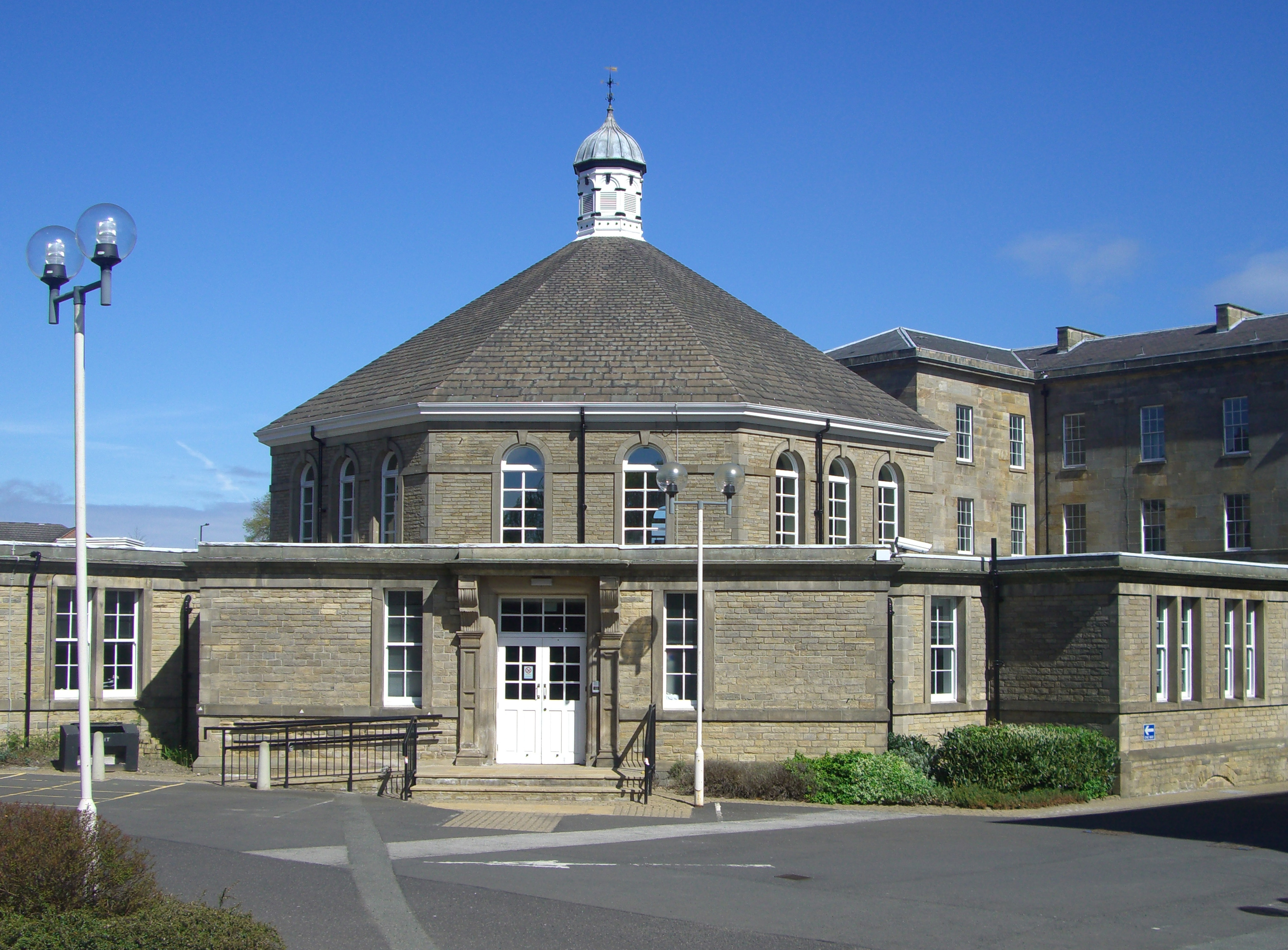
The roundhouse at the former Royal Infirmary

Webster's first church commission was Ranmoor Wesleyan Chapel on Ranmoor Road (demolished in 1963), the 1870s and 1880s were a busy time for ecclesiastical building with much funding coming from the Church Extension Society. Webster designed 15 churches in Sheffield (more than any other architect) and extended many others. His work included St Pauls’, Norton Lees (1877), Trinity Wesleyan Church, London Road (1879), St Bartholomews’, Burgoyne Road (1881), St Anns’, Netherthorpe (1882), St Clements, Newhall, Attercliffe (1886), St Matthias’, Stocksbridge (1890), St Bartholomews’, Carbrook (1890), Christ Church, Gleadless (extended 1890 and 1897), St Augustines’, Brocco Bank (1898), St Cuthberts’, Fir Vale (1902), Attercliffe Chapel (remodelled 1909), St Oswalds’, Millhouses (1910) and St Timothys’, Slinn Street, Crookes (1911). In 1894 Webster was appointed Diocesan Surveyor for the Sheffield area of the Diocese of York and this gave him continuous ecclesiastical work until his death. In 1900 he was joined in the practice by his son John Douglas Webster and this saw the practice move to a more modern design of church, as illustrated by St Timothys‘, Crookes which was built in the more fashionable Gothic Perdendicular style

=== Hospitals ===
Hospitals and their architecture were of special interest to Webster and it is in this field that he did some of his best work. In 1876 Webster was part of the three-person committee that founded the Sheffield Children's Hospital. Webster along with the solicitor Henry Vickers and the surgeon Dr William Jackson Cleaver, issued a statement saying it was “expedient to found an institution for the relief of poor sick children”. The Children's Hospital opened on 15 November 1876 in Brightmore House at a rent of £63 per annum. Webster served on the hospital's management committee for many years overseeing its expansion, when the hospital moved to new buildings on Western Bank in 1902 he acted as architect, completing the building in red brick Tudor style with tower.

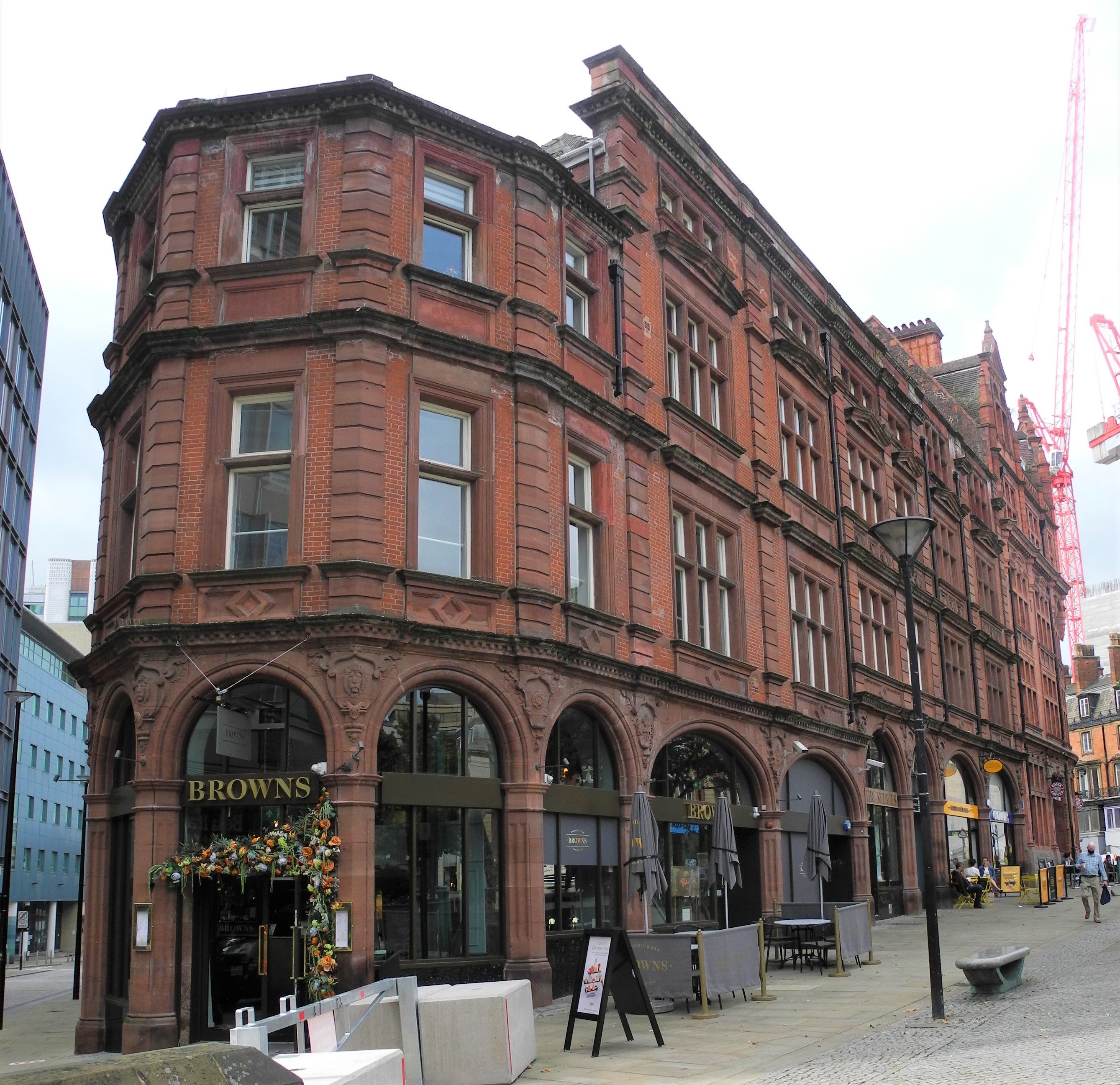
St Pauls Parade in Central Sheffield

Webster designed the Jessop Hospital for women in 1878 in late Gothic style "with some strange detailing", it is a grade II listed building which now house the University of Sheffield Music Department. Webster returned 24 years later and added an Edwardian extension of additional wards (1902). The Grade II listed extension was controversially demolished in 2013, despite vigorous protests by The Victorian Society and the Hallamshire Historic Buildings Society to make way for “The Diamond” a new £81 million building for the Department of Engineering.

Other hospital related buildings by Webster include the Medical School on Leopold Street in 1888. He oversaw extensions to the Ecclesall workhouse which included a new male ward block (1891) and infirmary (1894), the workhouse would later become Nether Edge Hospital. Webster also carried out extensions to the original Sheffield Royal Infirmary at Upperthorpe, he added the Outpatients Department in 1884, an innovative octagonal structure now known as the roundhouse, it was influenced by advocates of the circular hospital ward. He also added the Nurses Home (Centenary House) in 1897, both the infirmary buildings are now Grade II listed buildings.

=== Other work ===
The early days of the practice in the 1870s saw much work being done designing private houses in the developing, affluent Sheffield suburb of Ranmoor. The best two examples are West Lea (1870) and Ranfall (1871) on Ranmoor Park Road, both are built in a conservative, classical style typical of Sheffield at the time. He also designed a dignified Italianate lodge at 83 Ranmoor Road (1874). Storth Oaks at 229 Graham Road was built in the late 1860s as a private house in the Swiss-Italian style, it is now a treatment centre for adults with drug and alcohol problems, it is a grade II listed building. Webster carried out extensions to Totley Hall in 1883 and 1894 which included a billiard room with a 4-light stained glass window. In 1905 Webster was commissioned to design the Boer War Monument to the York and Lancaster Regiment, known as the Transvaal Memorial, it was originally situated in Sheffield Cathedral and was moved to Weston Park in 1963. The simple memorial was originally set into a granite wall but is now free standing and consists of a bronze panel listing the names of the dead flanked by soldiers with bowed heads.

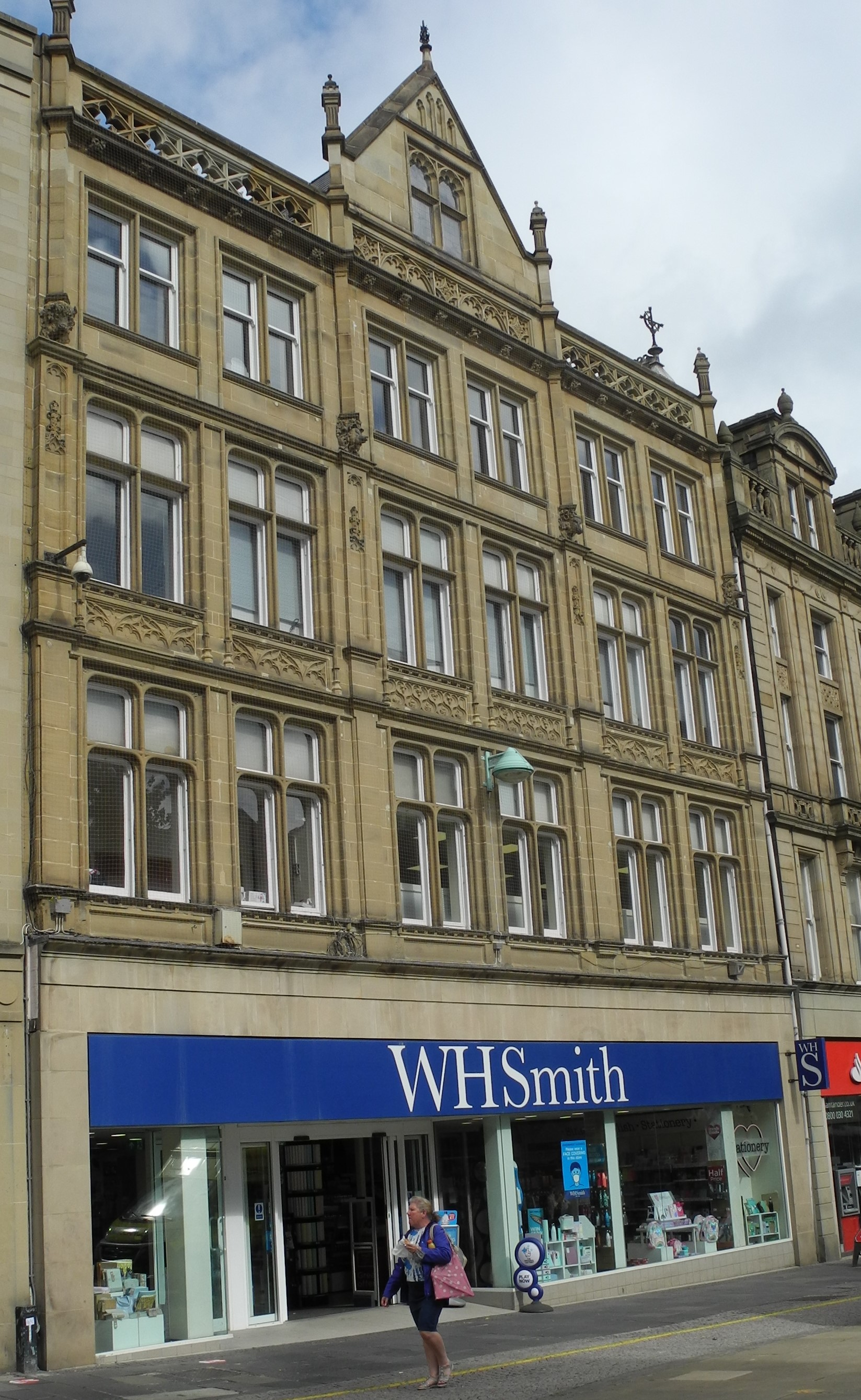
38–40 Fargate in Sheffield

Webster has very little recorded work in the centre of Sheffield, probably due to the loss of records, however, in addition to the already mentioned Medical School on Leopold Street, examples do exist. He designed the Norfolk Street section of St Pauls Parade to the south of the Peace Gardens, built between 1898 and 1901 as an extension to the Pinstone Street section, it is finished in warm coloured brick with red sandstone dressing. It has been rebuilt behind the facade and now houses retail and offices. In 1881 he designed 38–40 Fargate for the grocer Arthur Davy, it was claimed to be the largest provision shop in the country at the time, it now houses a branch of WHSmith. The Bainbridge building on the corner of Surrey Street and Norfolk Street were designed for the local Member of parliament and businessman Emerson Bainbridge in 1894, it has a prominent corner two-storey oriel window over the entrance. The building was rebuilt behind the facade in 1978 and housed a branch of the Halifax Bank for many years, it stands vacant as of 2020.

Webster's private residence was at Sunbury on Westbourne Road at Broomhill. He died in October 1913 aged 74.

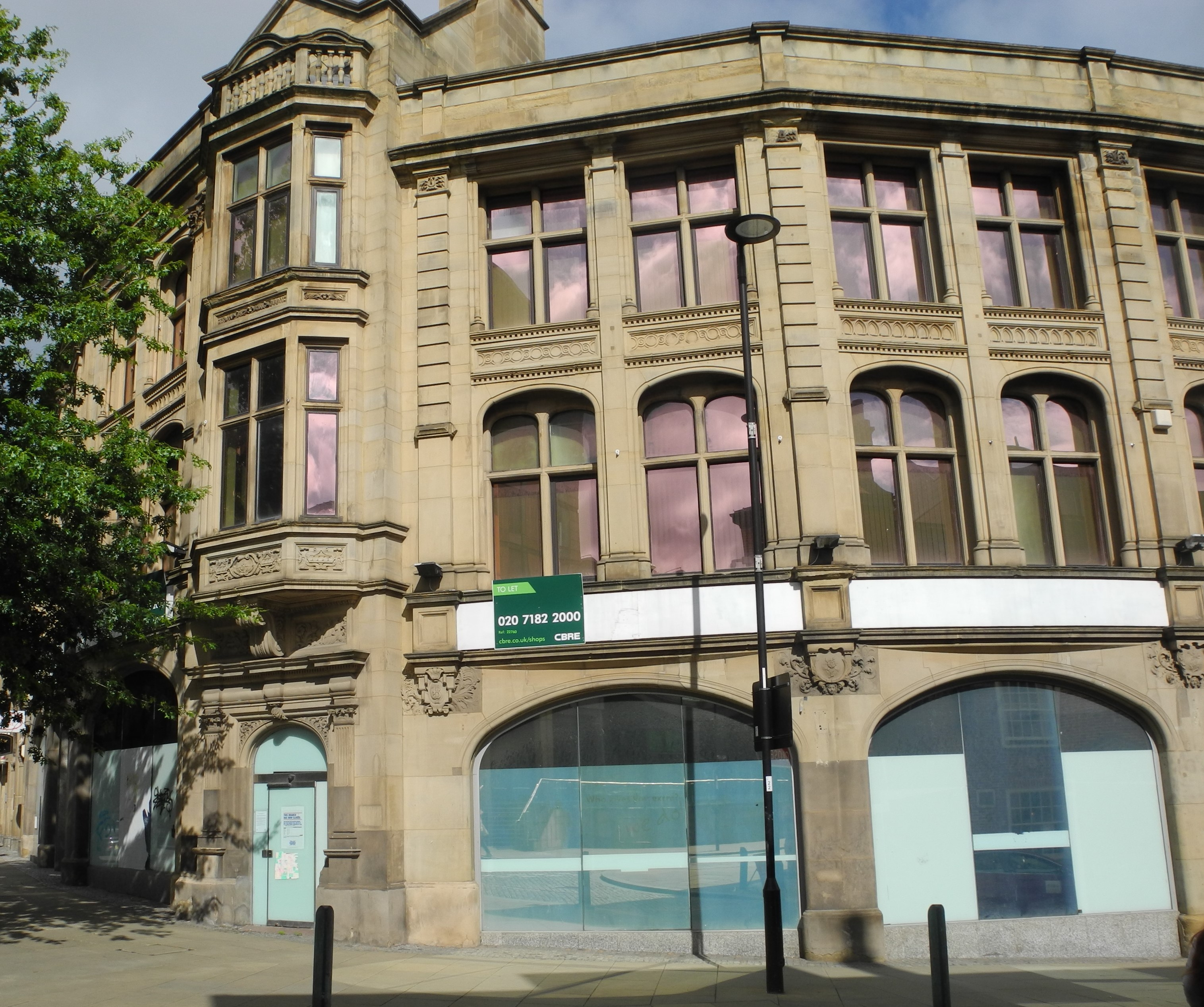
The Bainbridge building on Surrey Street, Sheffield

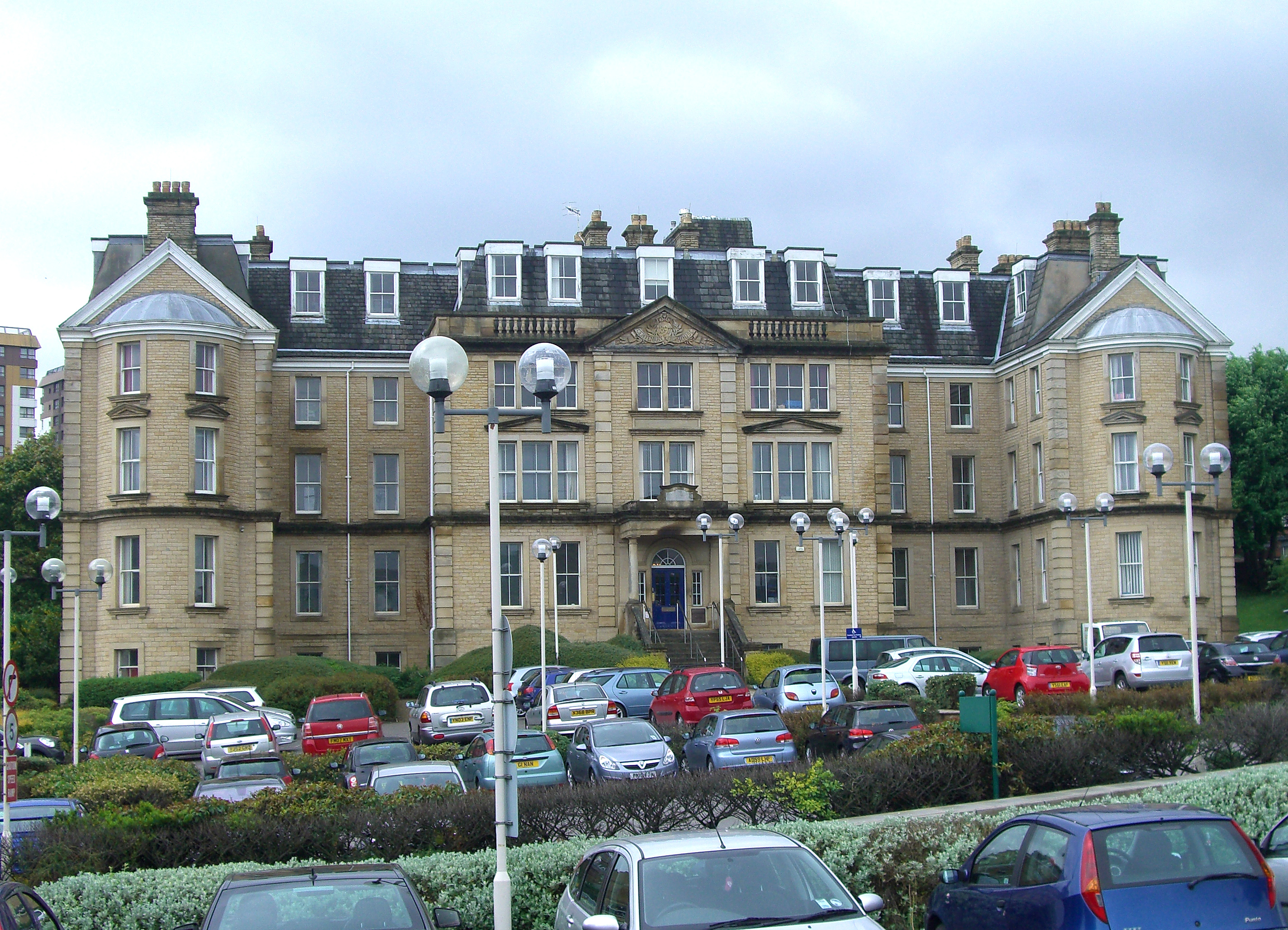
Centenary House at the Royal Infirmary.

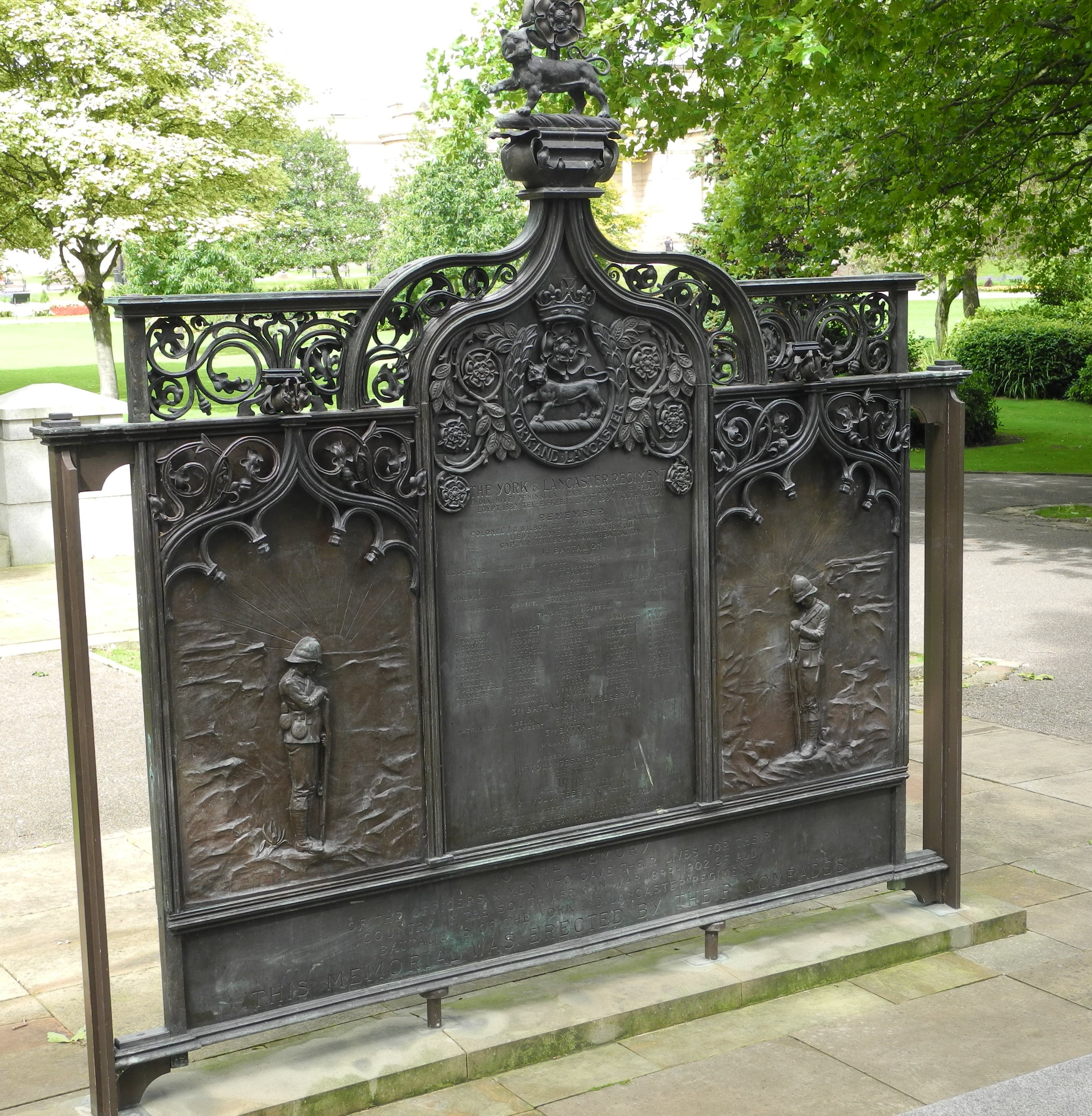
York and Lancaster Regiment Boer War Memorial at Weston Park, Sheffield.

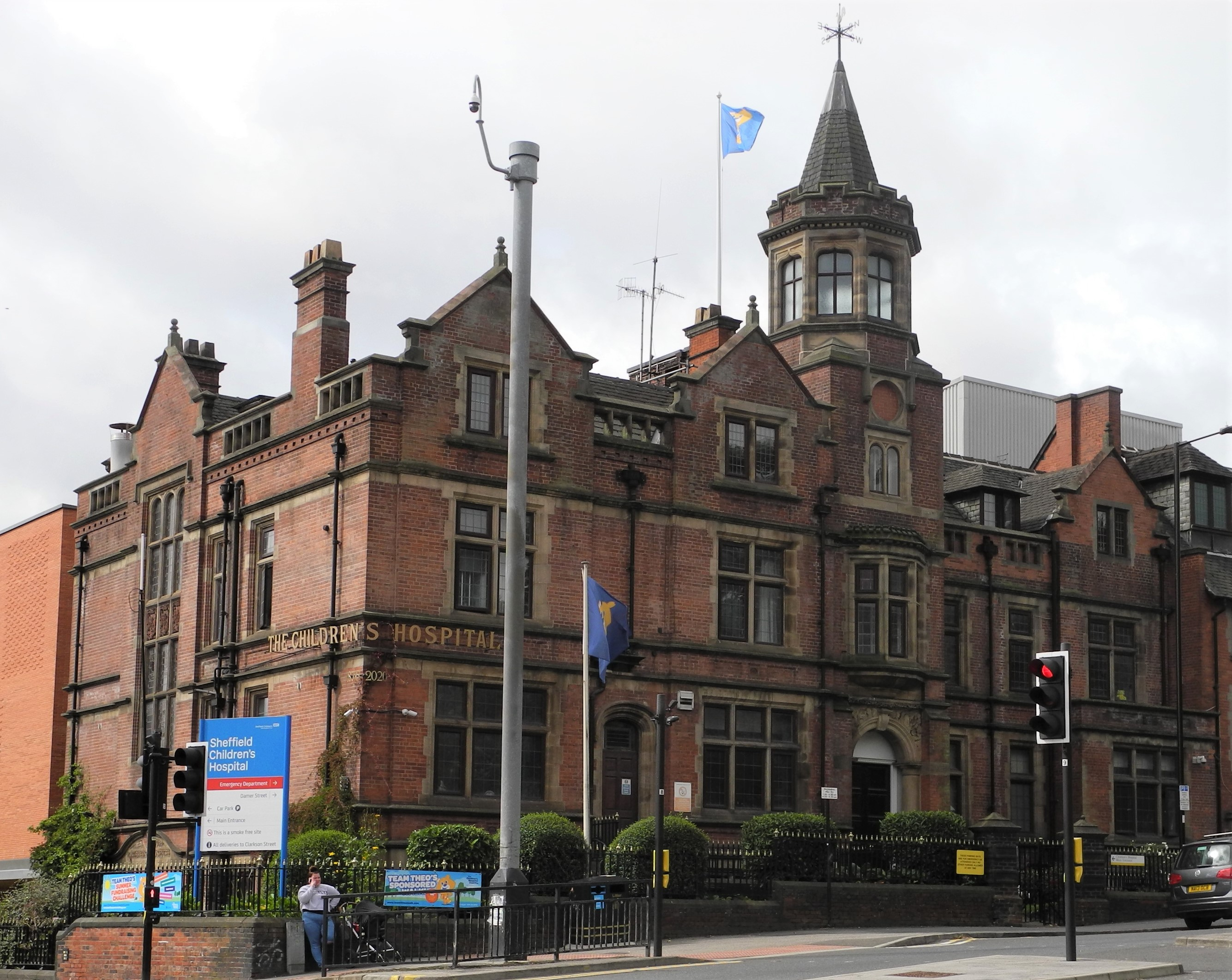
The Sheffield Children's Hospital on Brook Hill.

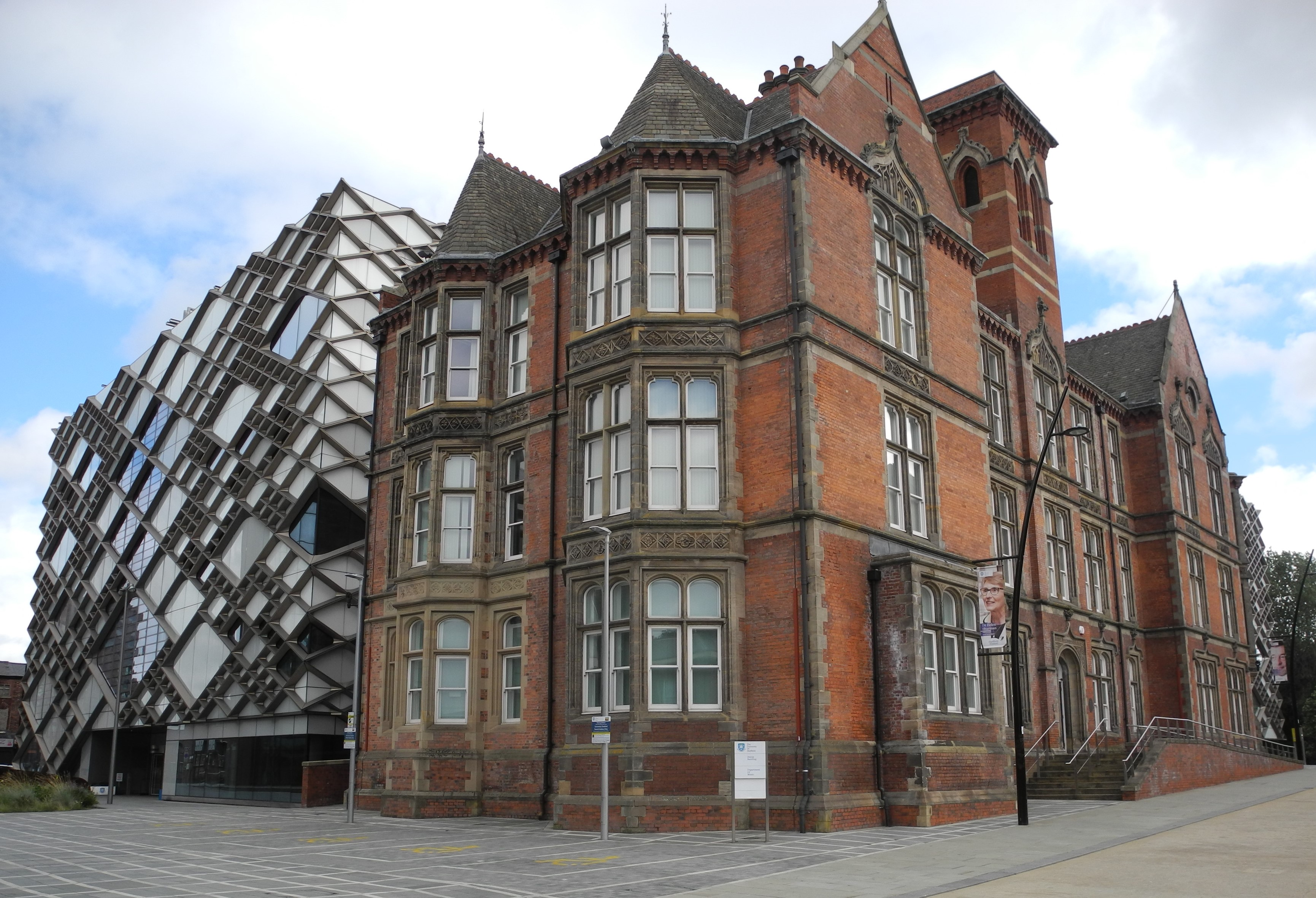
Webster's Victorian part of Jessop Hospital now house the University of Sheffield Faculty of Music.

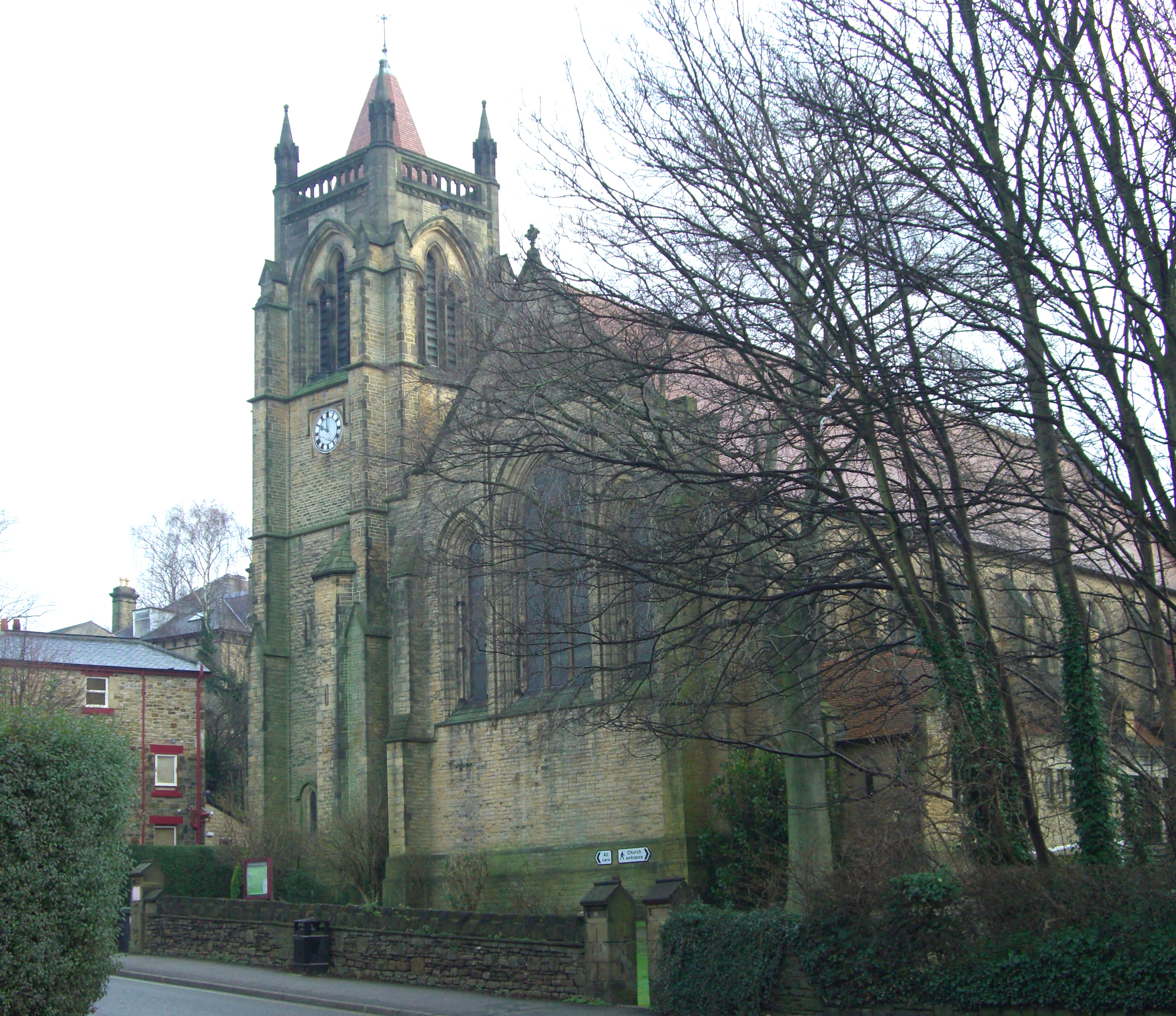
St Augustine's, Brocco Bank.

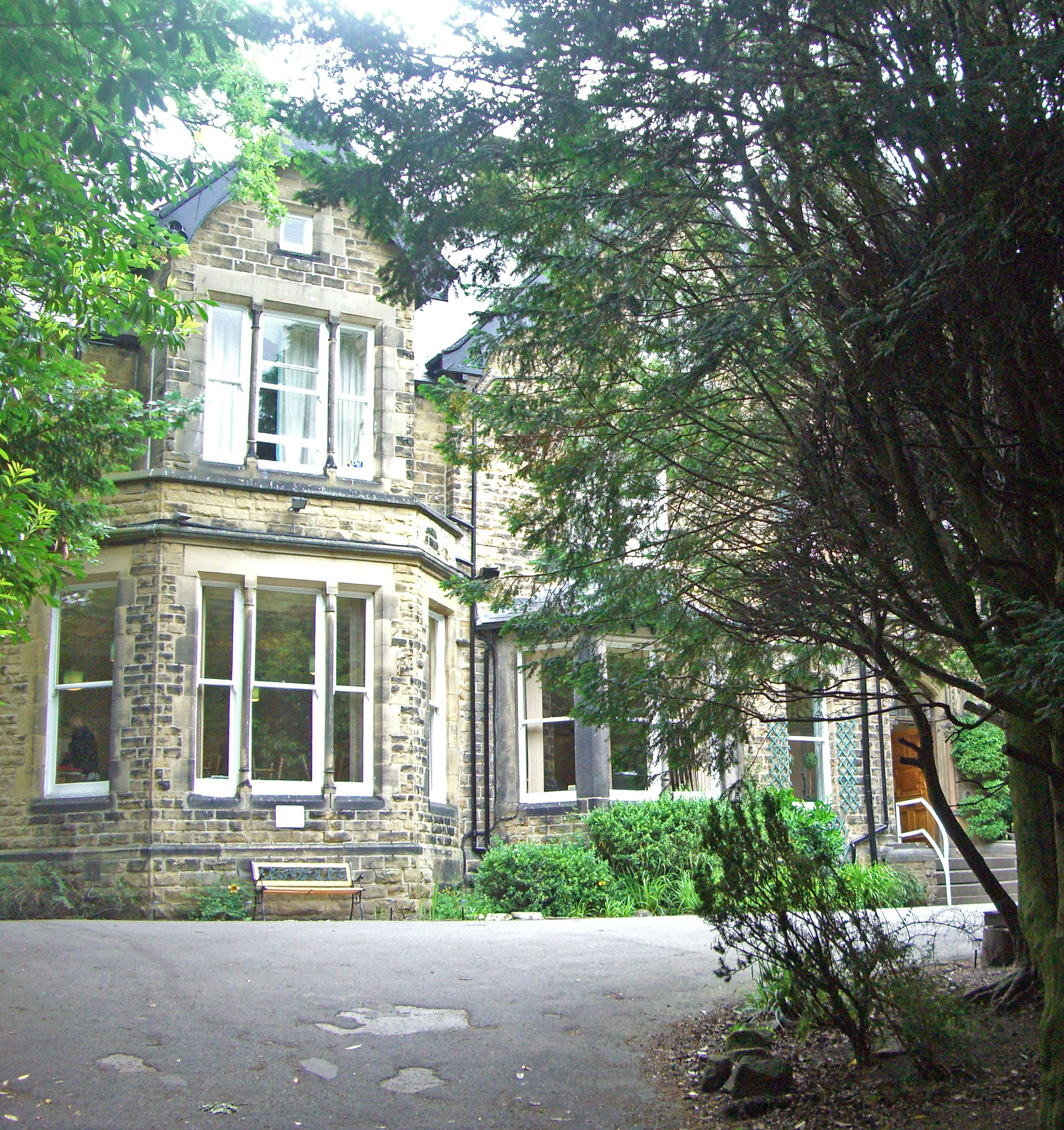
Storth Oak on Graham Road, Ranmoor.
