= Kirk Bridge Dike =

Stream in South Yorkshire, England

Coordinates: 53°23′36″N 1°25′27″W

Kirk Bridge Dike is a stream located in Darnall, Sheffield, South Yorkshire.

== Description ==
The stream flows under Darnall Road, and into the Sheffield Canal. It is approximately 56 meters in length. Yorkshire Water reported major sewage discharge in the stream in 2020.
