= Benjamin Huntsman =

English inventor and manufacturer (1704–1776)

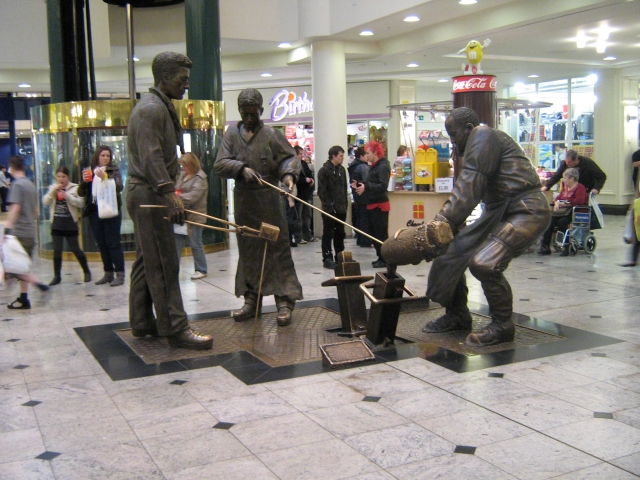
A tribute set of figures to Huntsman.

Benjamin Huntsman (4 June 1704 – 20 June 1776) was an English inventor and manufacturer of cast or crucible steel.

== Biography ==
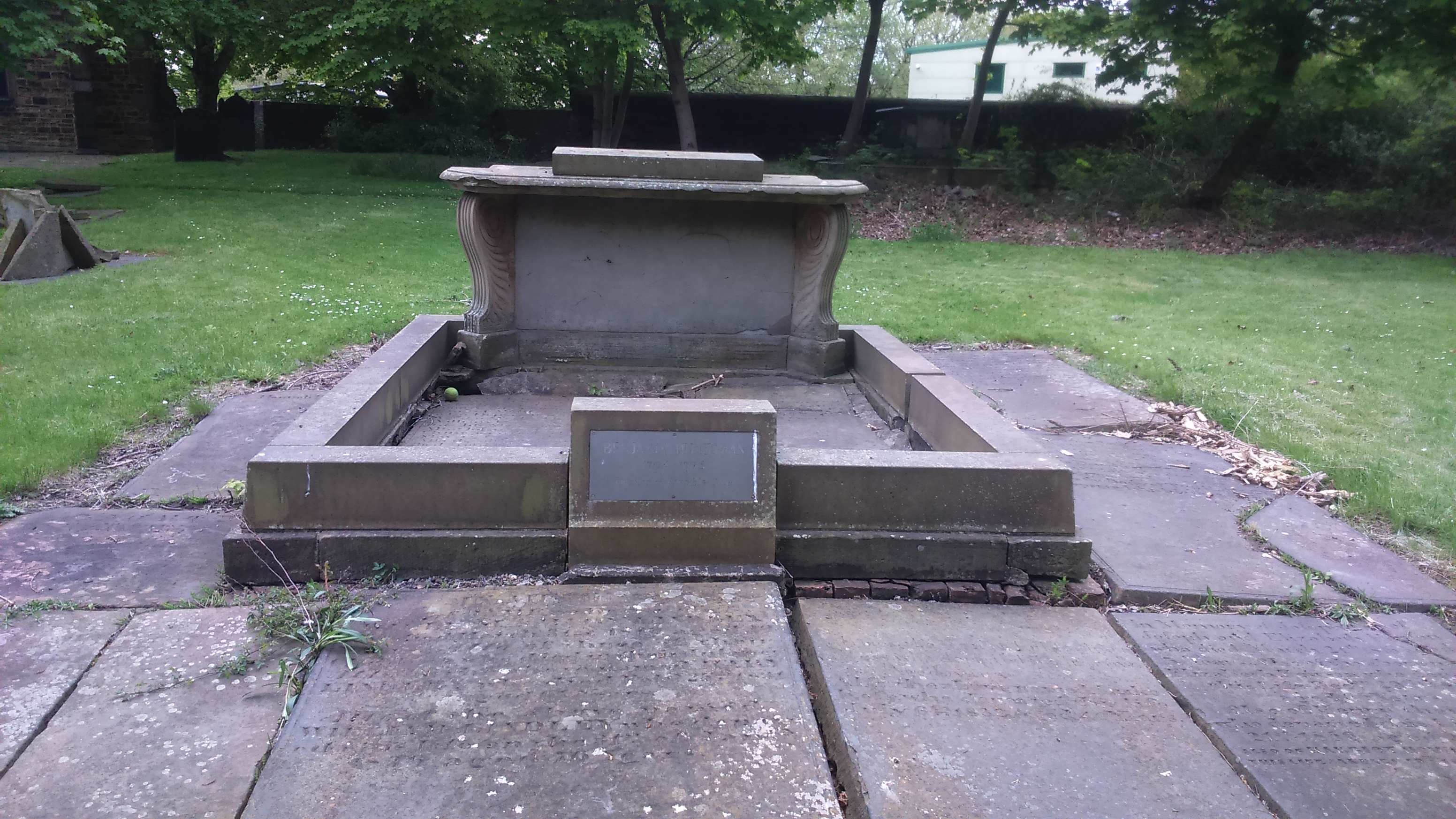
Benjamin Huntsman's tomb, in the graveyard of Attercliffe Chapel

Huntsman was born the fourth child of William and Mary (née Nainby) Huntsman, a Quaker farming couple, in Epworth, Lincolnshire. Some sources suggest that his parents were German immigrants, but it seems that they were both born in Lincolnshire.

Huntsman started business as a clock, lock and tool maker in Doncaster, Yorkshire. His reputation enabled him to also practice surgery in an experimental fashion and he was also consulted as an oculist.

Huntsman experimented in steel manufacture, first at Doncaster. Then, in 1740, he moved to Handsworth, near Sheffield. Eventually, after many experiments, Huntsman was able to make satisfactory cast steel, in clay pot crucibles, each holding about 34 pounds (15 kg) of blistered steel. A flux was added, and they were covered and heated by means of coke for about three hours. The molten steel was then poured into moulds and the crucibles reused. The first object to contain Crucible Cast Steel, was a longcase clock, made by Huntsman. It is on display in the Enid Hattersley Gallery at Kelham Island Museum. The local cutlery manufacturers refused to buy Huntsman's cast steel, as it was harder than the German steel they were accustomed to using. For a long time, Huntsman exported his whole output to France.

The growing competition of imported French cutlery made from Huntsman's cast-steel alarmed the Sheffield cutlers, who, after trying unsuccessfully to get the export of the steel prohibited by the British government, were compelled to use it in the interests of self-preservation. Huntsman had not patented his process, and his secret was discovered by a Sheffield iron-founder called Walker. Walker, according to legend, entered Huntsman's works in the disguise of a starving beggar asking to sleep by a fire for the night.

In 1770, Huntsman moved his enterprise to Worksop Road in Attercliffe, where he prospered until his death in 1776 and was laid to rest with a commemorative tomb in the Hilltop Cemetery, Attercliffe Common. The business was taken over by his son, William Huntsman (1733–1809).

At Sheffield's Northern General Hospital one of the original main buildings is named after him, and in the city centre is a Wetherspoons pub called The Benjamin Huntsman.
