= William Staniforth =

English surgeon (1749–1833)

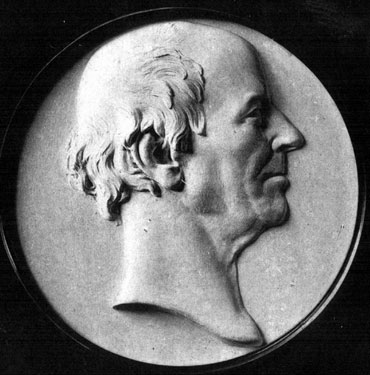
- Medallion of Sheffield surgeon William Staniforth
- Born: 9 October 1749; Sheffield, England
- Died: 1834; Sheffield, England
- Spouse: Ann Cam
- Children: 3 sons; 3 daughters
- Parent(s): Samuel Staniforth; Mary Ash
- Relatives: Staniforth Smith (great-grandson)

William Staniforth (1749–1833) was an English surgeon, one of the first three surgeons at the Sheffield Royal Infirmary.

Born on 9 October 1749, William was the son of Samuel Staniforth (1725-1811) and Mary Ash. His brother Samuel (1747-1824) was a linen draper, and lived next door to William on Castle Street (then known as Truelove's Gutter). In the 1876 publication Reminiscences of Old Sheffield: Its Streets and Its People local citizen William Wragg described Staniforth as being 'the best operative surgeon and oculist in town' and 'celebrated' for his Staniforth's Eye Ointment. He introduced Jenner's Smallpox vaccinations to Sheffield.

He had a collection of coins, prints and (in the words of Joseph Hunter) "rarities of various kinds", which included Jonathan Salt's Hortus Siccus, which after Salt's death came into Staniforth's possession via an unknown route some time before 1826 when he sold it to the Sheffield Literary and Philosophical Society.

Staniforth retired in 1819 and died on 21 August 1833. He was buried in Attercliffe Chapel. Prior to the Infirmary being redeveloped, a medallion was placed on the wall of the Board Room.

His son, William, also became a surgeon at the Infirmary.

== Sources ==
- Clay, John W., ed. (1895). "Staniforth". The Publications of the Harleian Society. Vol. 38. London. pp. 728–735. (The Publications of the Harleian Society at the Internet Archive)
- Leader, Robert Eadon, ed. (1876). "Water Lane Head". Reminiscences of Old Sheffield: Its Streets and Its People. Sheffield: Leader & Sons.
- Leader, Robert Eadon (1901). Sheffield in the Eighteenth Century. Sheffield: Independent Press. (Sheffield in the Eighteenth Century at the Internet Archive)
- Odom, William (1926). Hallamshire Worthies. Sheffield: J. W. Northend.
- Ryan, Michael, ed. (5 October 1833). "The General Dispensary Aldersgate Street". The London Medical and Surgical Journal: Exhibiting a View of the Improvements and Discoveries in the Various Branches of Medical Science. Vol. 4, no. 88. London: Henry Renshaw. pp. 313–314.
- Hunter, Joseph (1879). "Prefatory Letter to Wilson's Yorkshire Deeds". Yorkshire Archaeological and Topographical Journal. London: Bradbury, Agnery & Co. pp. 64–68.
- Alberti, Samuel J. M. M. (September 2002). "Placing Nature: Natural History Collections and Their Owners in Nineteenth-Century Provincial England". The British Journal for the History of Science. 35 (3): 291–311. doi:10.1017/S0007087402004727. JSTOR 4028125. PMID 12395797. S2CID 25454499.
