= Staniforth Road =

Street in Sheffield, England

Coordinates: 53.389995°N 1.429595°W

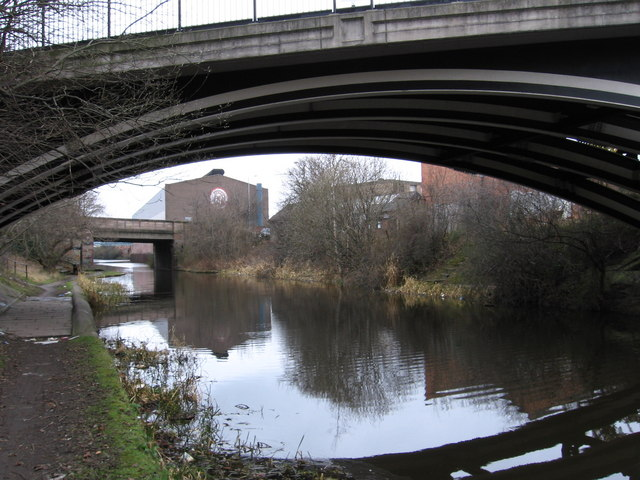
Sheffield Road bridge crossing the Sheffield & Tinsley Canal

Staniforth Road is located in Sheffield, England. It connects the Attercliffe and Darnall areas of the city.

Historically the road has been used as a shopping street, with notable businesses being present over the years, including 2 cinemas, the Regal near Attercliffe Road and the Balfour. The road features a bridge that crosses over the Sheffield & Tinsley Canal.

On 25 October 2018 a Sheffield Stagecoach Supertram operating on the newly opened Tram-Train route collided with a lorry at the Staniforth Road/Woodburn Road junction. It is believed the lorry ran a red light. Several people were taken to hospital but there were no fatalities. No action was taken against the driver of the lorry.

== Name ==
The road is named for Samuel Staniforth Esq. who built and resided at Darnall Hall. The Staniforth family were present in Darnall and Attercliffe for centuries.
