= Naylor TF 1700 =

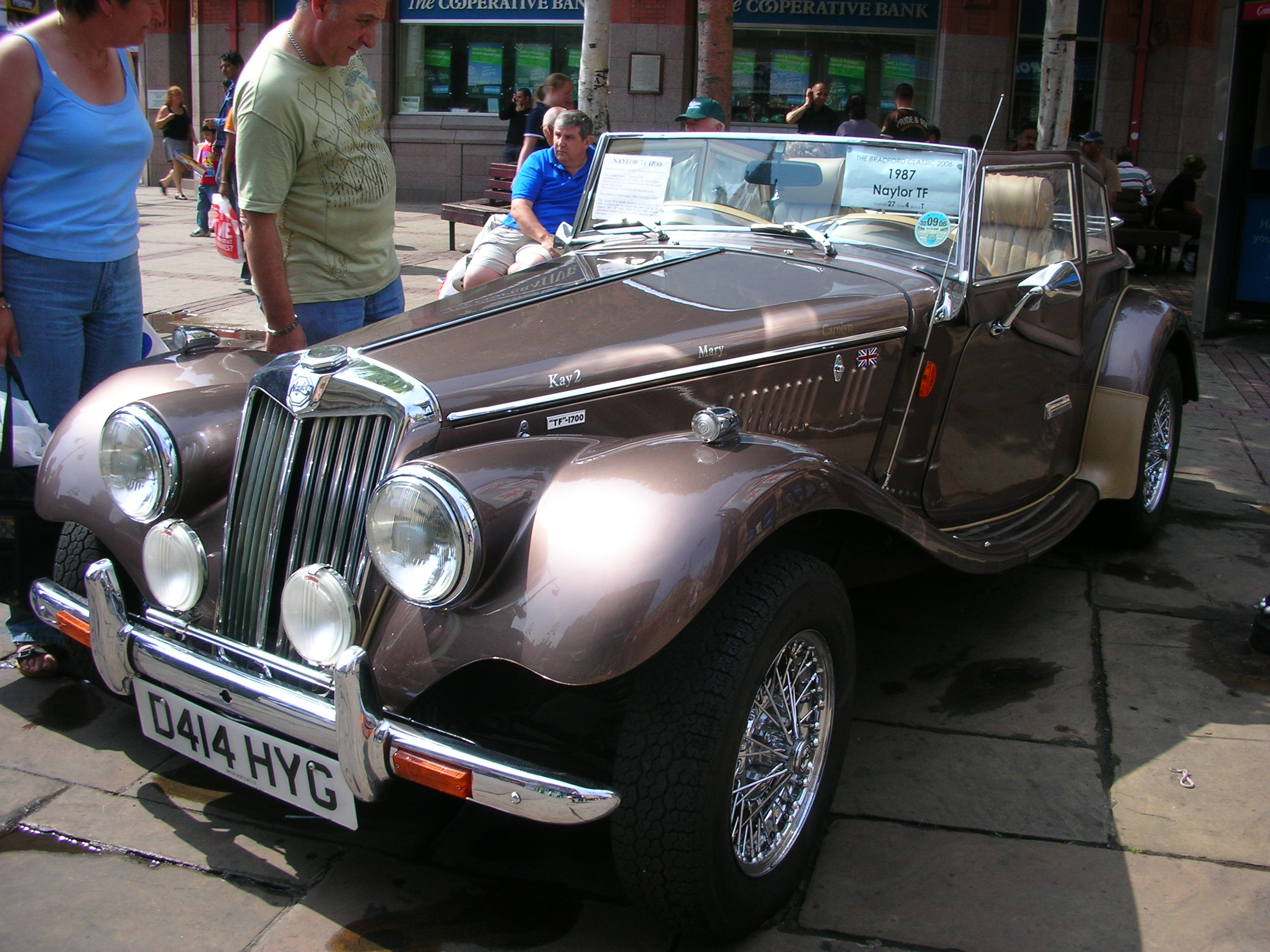
- Naylor TF 1700

Overview
- Manufacturer: Naylor Cars (1985-1986); Hutson Motor Company (1988-1991)
- Also called: Hutson TF 1700; Mahcon TF 1700

Body and chassis
- Body style: 2-door, 2-seat roadster
- Layout: Front-engine, RWD

Powertrain
- Engine: 1,695 cc O-series I4
- Transmission: 4-speed manual

Dimensions
- Wheelbase: 2,400 mm (94 in)
- Curb weight: 868 kg (1,914 lb)

The Naylor TF 1700 is a British sports car built in the 1980s by Naylor Cars, Ltd., located in Shipley, West Yorkshire, England. Presented in 1984, it was the brainchild of Alastair Naylor and was developed together with Allan Staniforth.

== Design ==
The two-seater steel roadster bodywork was an unusually faithful replica of the celebrated MG TF. As with the MG TF, the TF 1700 had a front engine and rear-wheel drive. The Naylor was also uncommonly well-equipped (and as a result expensive), with Connolly leather interior and real spoked wheels. Its price in 1985 was GBP13,950, only forty pounds less than the considerably more powerful Morgan Plus 8 Injection. Like the Morgan, the Naylor has a body constructed from metal panels attached to a wooden body-frame constructed from ash wood (not to be confused with the chassis, which is steel in both the Naylor and the Morgan). Most of the car's mechanicals came straight from the Morris Marina/Ital, including the 1.7 litre SOHC O-series engine with 77 hp (57 kW) and the four-speed manual transmission. The rear axle was the Marina's live unit with coil springs. The front suspension is independent, with coil sprung MacPherson struts, and a rack-and-pinion steering. Top speed is 94 mph (151 km/h). The TF 1700 was fully type-approved and came with a warranty from the Austin Rover Group.

== History ==
Naylor moved to a new factory in April 1985, after which production was ramped up. Naylor worked steadily to improve the car and to make its handling characteristics close to those of the original, depending on Lotus' chassis expertise. About 100 cars were built by Naylor until the company went bankrupt in 1986, in some part due to the company's not being able to shake the kit car image. This was in spite of Margaret Thatcher allowing herself to be photographed driving a Naylor in front of 10 Downing Street, part of an effort to inspire small British manufacturers. The car in question (pictured in the infobox) had licence plate D414HYG and was the 100th TF 1700 built. The Naylor venture helped establish the pattern of cooperation between Austin Rover and the British Motor Industry Heritage which led to the production of the RV8.

== Hutson TF ==
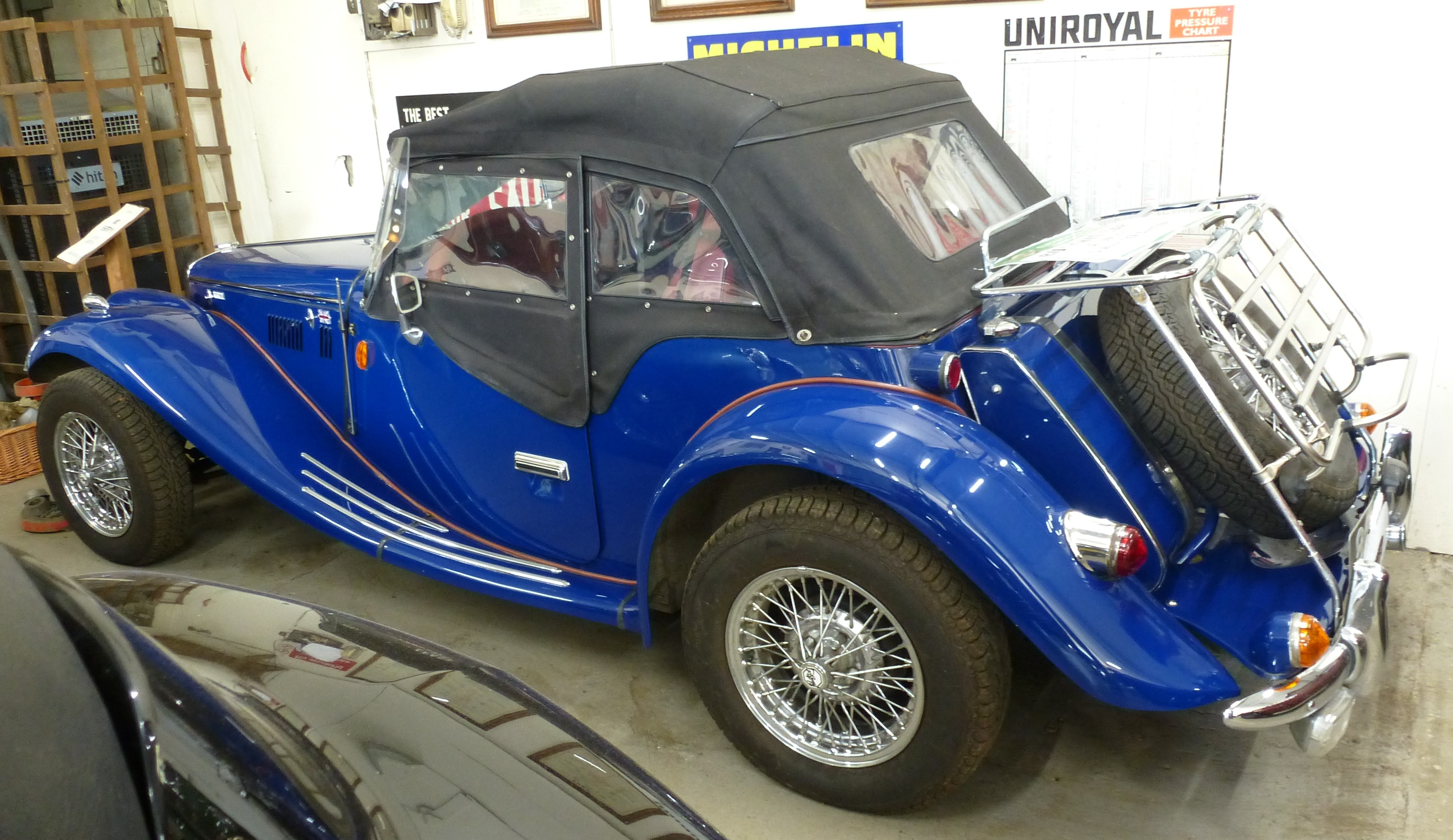
Rear view of 1991 Hutson TF 1700

The project, factory and all, was passed into the hands of Maurice Hutson's Mahcon (Maurice Arthur Hutson Construction) group in 1986. They kept building it as Naylor Sports Cars, Ltd., until the Hutson Motor Company was formed in 1988 and started selling the car as the Hutson TF 1700. About 61 more finished cars were built by Hutson, the last example being finished in 1991. A small number of kit car versions were also sold, under the name Mahcon.
