= Sheffield Royal Infirmary =

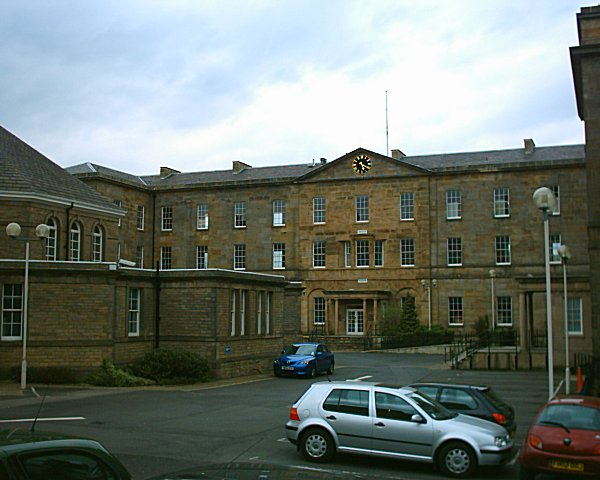
- The former infirmary

- Shown in South Yorkshire

Geography
- Location: Sheffield, South Yorkshire, England
- Coordinates: 53.39°N 1.484°W

Organisation
- Care system: Public
- Type: General
- Affiliated university: None

Services
- Emergency department: No

History
- Founded: 4 October 1797
- Closed: 13 December 1980

Links
- Lists: Hospitals in England

The Royal Infirmary was a hospital in Upperthorpe, Sheffield, South Yorkshire, England.

== History ==
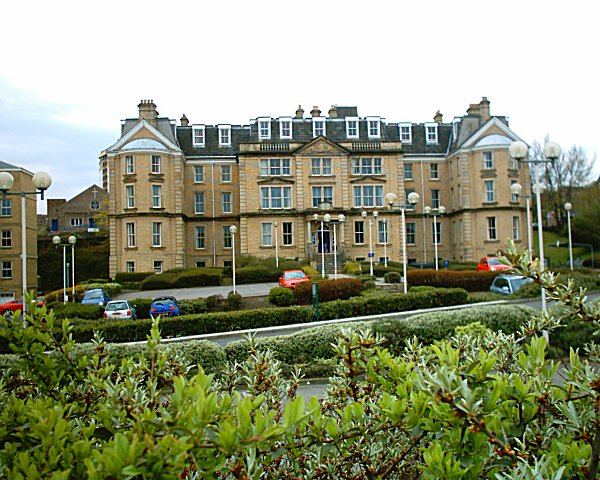
The nurses' home

Founding an infirmary for Sheffield was suggested in an anonymous letter written 1789 and following a public meeting in April 1792, public subscriptions amounting to £15,000 were collected and a site on Upperthorpe Meadows purchased. Designed by John Rawsthorne, with many unique features, the first stone of the new building was laid 4 September 1793 and the hospital opened on 4 October 1797. The main entrance featured two niched statues of 'Hope' and 'Charity' (now replicas), by renowned Sheffield born sculptor Sir Francis Leggatt Chantrey. A biblical inscription above the door read; I was sick and ye visited me, verily in as much as ye have done it unto one of the least of my brethren, ye have done it unto me.

With accommodation for around 100 in-patients, its senior staff comprised three physicians (including William Younge to whom the initial anonymous letter was attributed, who served in post for 43 years) three surgeons (Mr. Cheney, Mr. C. H. Webb and William Staniforth) and a Matron. The founders had been able to acquire a large site with space for expansion; later additions included the Recovery House 1839, later called the Norfolk Wing, designed by William Flockton in the same style as the main building, detached to serve as an isolation unit, the Victoria Block in 1872, and a new south-east wing designed by John Dodsley Webster which was completed 1884. Incorporated in the new courtyard was an innovative octagonal outpatients department, lit by a cupola, with a roof of wrought iron lattice girders; it had a tiled waiting room with consulting rooms leading off it.

A nurses' home named "Centenary House", also designed by Webster, was completed in 1897, the Infirmary's 100th year, along with ophthalmic wards and a theatre, and the hospital was renamed from Sheffield General Infirmary, to Sheffield Royal Infirmary. Further additions followed in the 20th century. Radium treatment was first carried out in 1914 and the Radium Centre established at the Infirmary in 1930.

In April 1941, during the Second World War, incendiary bombs fell on the infirmary. The buildings were saved by fire-fighters, while patients were moved to the safety of its basements, with underground tunnels providing protective routes between buildings. The hospital provided accommodation for military patients as well as civilian air raid casualties.

The infirmary joined the National Health Service in 1948. In 1980, after almost 200 years of medical care, it was closed, with services being transferred to the Royal Hallamshire Hospital. The last patient was discharged on 13 December 1980, the premises entirely vacated December 1983. The empty infirmary building was later used for filming a casualty scene from an imagined nuclear attack on Sheffield in the 1984 film Threads. Some of the hospital buildings were demolished, replaced with a supermarket and large car-parking area, but the original block along with its south-east and south-west wings, which remains a Grade II* listed building survived, it was renamed Heritage House and converted into offices. Heritage House was subsequently converted for use as rental accommodation.

A former gatehouse lodge also remains, although late 2020 was in a state of neglect, marred by graffiti.
