= St Theresa's Catholic Primary School =

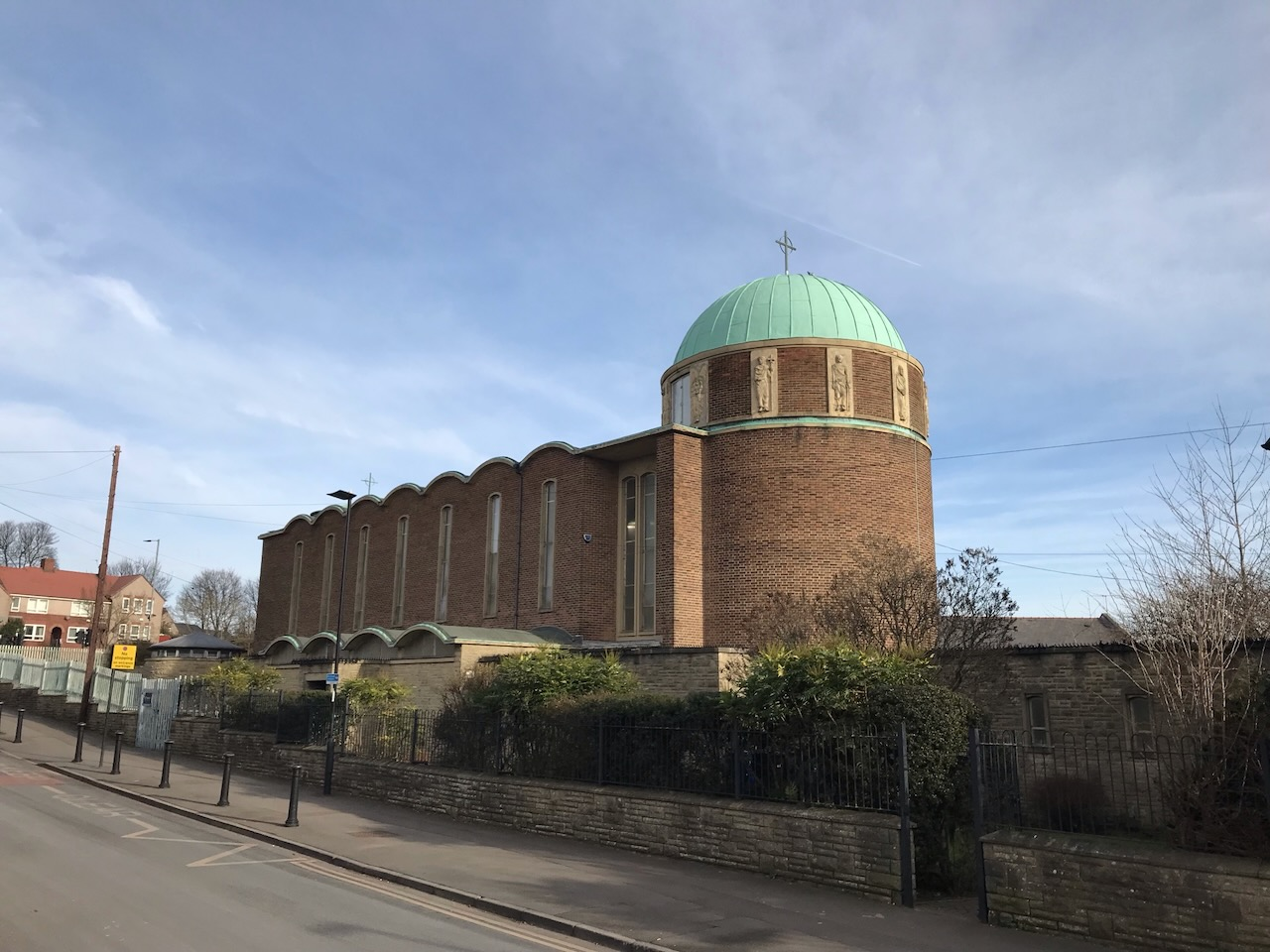

Location
- Prince Of Wales Road; Sheffield, South Yorkshire, S2 1EY; England; 53.364100°N 1.421461°W

Information
- Type: Voluntary aided school
- Religious affiliation: Roman Catholic
- Established: 1927; 99 years ago
- Department for Education URN: 107158 Tables
- Ofsted: Reports
- Head teacher: A. Woodhead
- Gender: Mixed
- Age: 4 to 11
- Public transport: B P Manor Top
- Website: https://www.st-theresas-sheffield.co.uk/

St Theresa's Catholic Primary School is situated on Prince of Wales Road in the suburb of the Manor in the City of Sheffield, England. The school caters for children between the ages of three and eleven.

== Church ==
St. Theresa's Roman Catholic Church shares the parish with St. Anthony's Roman Catholic Church in nearby Gleadless and Our Lady of Lourdes, Hackenthorpe, having previously shared a parish with St Joseph's Roman Catholic Church in Handsworth. The parish was founded in 1924, and there has been a church and school on the site since 1927.

The church is part of the Diocese of Hallam.
