= Ascend Cutlery Works =

Cutlery manufacturer

Ascend Cutlery Works was a cutlery manufacturing company based in Sheffield, England. The company was founded by William Thomas Staniforth in 1849 on Arundel Lane and was noted for its razors, table knives, and scissors.

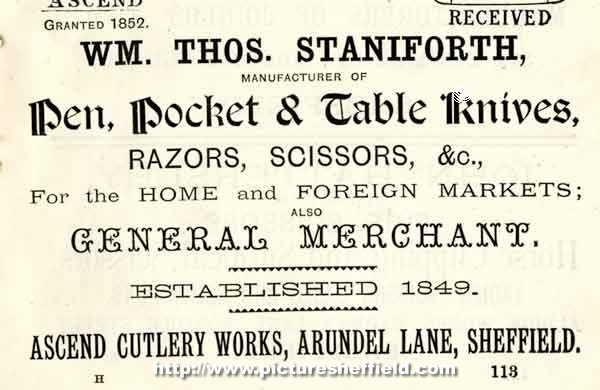

When William Thomas Staniforth died in 1890, the company was passed to his son of the same name. It did not last into the 20th century, and with his son emigrated to Canada, the company folded.

The company was featured at the 1893 Chicago World's Fair.
