= Allan Staniforth =

British journalist (1924–2009)

Allan Peter Staniforth (14 June 1924 – 2 May 2009) was a British journalist and engineer, notable as the joint-designer of the Terrapin style race car.

== Early life ==
Allan Peter Staniforth was born in Kings Norton in Birmingham, England to jeweller Arthur Staniforth and Maude Cross. He flew in the Royal Air Force during World War II and was a navigator during the Berlin Blockade in 1948. He suffered hearing loss which he attributed to the flying of the Lancaster Bomber.

== Career ==
Staniforth worked as a journalist for the Daily Mirror, writing reports on various subjects such as The Troubles, the Cod Wars and the Moors murders. Although he was well regarded in the journalism world, he is most notable for his motor racing hobby. He published books on the subject, and invented the small Terrapin car based on the A-series Mini engine. He was also involved with the design of the Naylor TF 1700.

In 1969 he wrote his first book High Speed, Low Cost where he described how to construct the Terrapin Hillclimb. He would use these cars to set fastest times in competitions around Britain.

== Publications ==
- High speed, low cost: The full Terrapin story (1969)
- Race & rally car source book: A D.I.Y. guide to building or modifying a race or rally car (1983)
- Competition Car Suspension: Design, Construction, Tuning (1989)
- Race and Rally Car Source Book – 30th Anniversary Edition: The Guide to Building or Modifying a Competition Car (2013)
