= Staniforth Range =

Mountain range in Papua New Guinea

- Location within Papua New Guinea

Geography
- Country: Papua New Guinea
- Region: Gulf Province
- Range coordinates: 7°17′S 145°42′E

Staniforth Range is a mountain range located in Gulf Province, Papua New Guinea. Yeripa and Taripa villages are the nearest populated places to the range.

== History ==
The mountain range is named after Miles Staniforth Cater Smith, an Australian politician who played a role in the passing of the Papua Act 1905 which saw the transfer of the territory of Papua from Britain to Australia.
