= John Staniforth =

British politician (1771–1830)

- Born: March 1771; London, England
- Died: 1830 (aged 58–59)
- Spouse: Maria Pitts
- Children: 5
- Relatives: Oswald Staniforth (great-grandson)

John Staniforth (1771 in London – 1830) was a British politician and director of the Bank of England.

== Early life ==
John Staniforth was the son of Charles Staniforth, a merchant of both the Broad Street Buildings, London and Kingston-Upon-Hull, and his wife Ann Green. His uncles John Staniforth (1725-1798), Philip Green and Joseph Green were notable Hull shipowners, and his uncle Joseph Green was based in Königsberg. On his father's death in 1797, John went into partnership with John Blunt, and carried on his father's London business.

== Parliamentary career ==
His uncle Philip Green brought him to Hull and persuaded him to stand for election to Parliament. Philip Green used his own popularity, gained through his shipping interests which brought money into the town, to ensure that John was elected in 1802 to represent Hull, a seat he would hold until 1818.

Philip Green died in 1803 and Staniforth increased his interest in Hull by setting up his own shipping business. He participated in attracting the East India Company to the Hull ports and in 1804 he procured naval contracts with the Hull naval yard. He was a director of the Bank of England from 1807 to 1819.

John Staniforth was recorded on a list of 'staunch friends' of the abolition of the slave trade, but did not support Richard Bland's motion on 9 April 1807. In 1810 he was listed as 'Government' on the Whigs list.

In 1818, Staniforth was criticised for participation in the profits of the East India Company monopoly amongst other things. Now facing financial difficulty, he announced his retirement from Parliament before the parliamentary election of that year. He was however nominated by a committee of friends but in the event was narrowly defeated at the polls.

Staniforth died in 1830. He had married in 1793 Maria Pitts of Bridlington Quay, Yorkshire and had a total of five children, of which four survived.
