= Oswald Staniforth =

British Franciscan friar

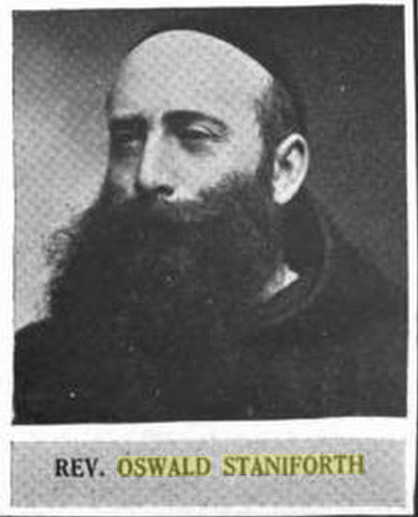
- Staniforth in 1896
- Born: George Edward Charles Staniforth; 1865; Erith, Kent, England
- Died: 1930 (aged 64–65); Wales
- Parent(s): Charles Staniforth; Agnes Harrietta Woodbridge
- Relatives: John Staniforth (great-grandfather)

Reverend Oswald Staniforth (born George Edward Charles Staniforth; 1865–1930) was a British Franciscan friar notable for his writings on various religious subjects.

== Biography ==
George was born in the town of Erith, Kent, to Charles Staniforth, an accountant who was born in Smyrna, Turkey as a British Subject, and Agnes Harrietta Woodbridge, born in France. By age fourteen he was attending St Augustine's College, Canterbury. He worked as a missionary during the Boer War, serving with the British Army in South Africa. He lived in various places over his life including Kent, Yorkshire, Wales and had worked as a missionary in California and Montreal.

== Writings ==
- The Saint of the Eucharist, Saint Paschal Baylon, Patron of Eucharistic Associations (1905) OCLC 975468498, OCLC 224151750, OCLC 974266360, OCLC 1078979178
- Sketch of St. Louis King of France
- Life of St. Francis OCLC 40721408
- The Third Order of Saint Francis: Being three lectures delivered at the Franciscan summer school, Oxford, August 1928 OCLC 11978646
