= Charles Staniforth Hext =

British military officer and artist

- Born: 5 February 1815; Lostwithiel, Cornwall, England
- Died: 26 January 1855 (aged 39); Attock, Punjab, India
- Parent(s): John Hext; Elizabeth Staniforth

Captain Charles Staniforth Hext (5 February 1815 – 26 January 1855) was a British military officer and artist.

Hext was born to Captain John Hext and Elizabeth Staniforth, on 5 February 1815. His mother was the daughter of Thomas Staniforth, former Lord Mayor of Liverpool, and his father a military captain.

He joined the 4th King's Own Regiment in 1835 and was stationed in New South Wales. He arrived at Hobart, Tasmania on 12 November 1836, before being sent to India in 1837.

He returned to Hobart on 24 November 1842, after narrowly escaping the wreck of the Waterloo convict ship in Cape Town.

He returned to India in 1843 where he remained with his regiment until his death in Attock, Punjab on 26 January 1855 of apoplexy.

== Art ==
Charles was also known for his Lithography, which he created during his time in Australia. Some of these were published in 1845 by Charles Hutchins in Liverpool.

== Collections ==
Hext's work is held in the permanent collection of the National Gallery of Australia; the National Library of Australia; the National Museum of Australia; and the State Library of New South Wales.
