= Staniforth Smith =

Australian politician

The Honourable Staniforth Smith MBE
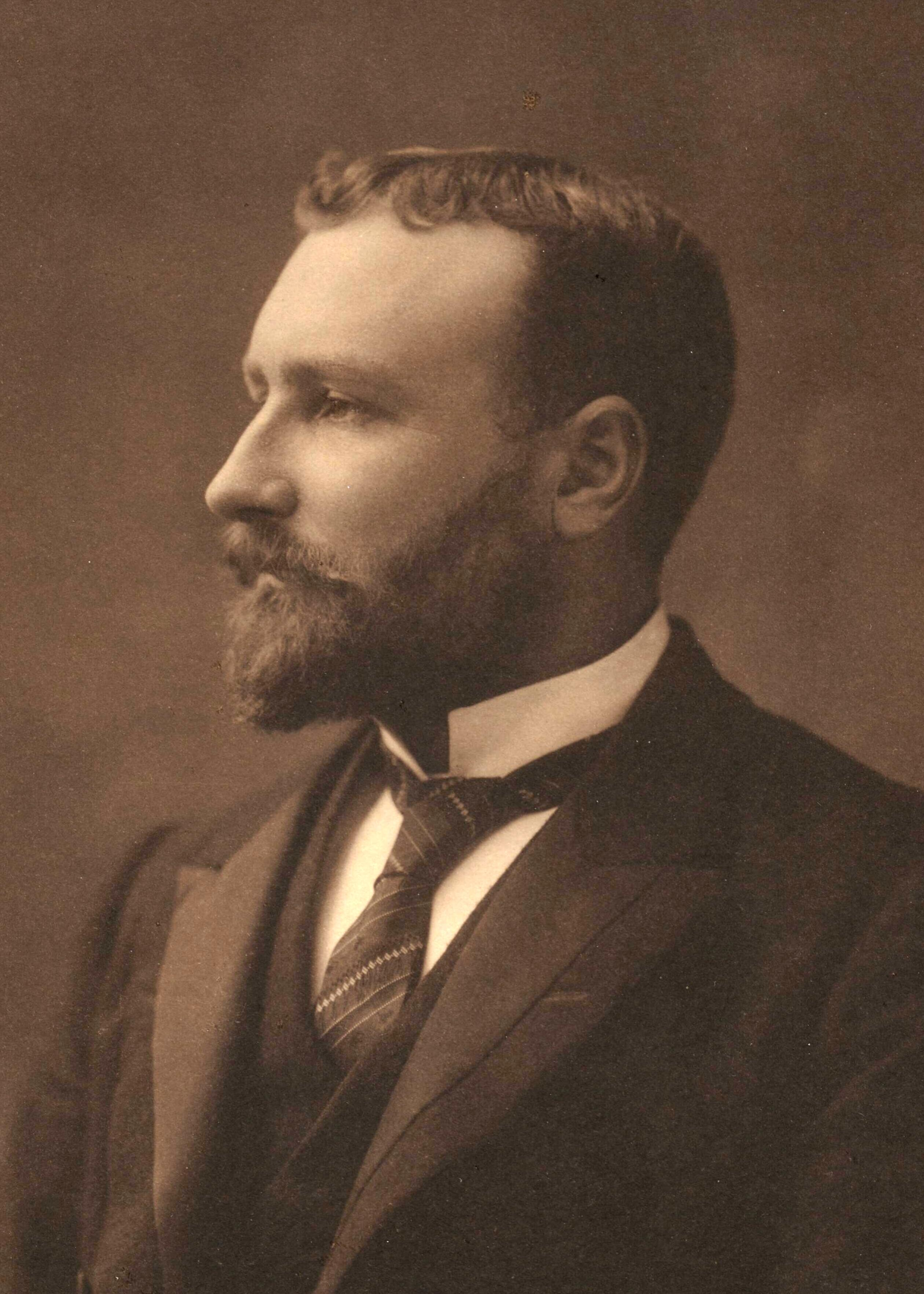

Senator for Western Australia
- In office 29 March 1901 – 31 December 1906

Personal details
- Born: 25 February 1869 Kingston, Victoria
- Died: 14 January 1934 (aged 64) Perth, Western Australia
- Party: Free Trade Party
- Education: University of Melbourne
- Occupation: Engineer

Miles Staniforth Cater Smith, MBE (25 February 1869 – 14 January 1934) was an Australian public servant, politician and explorer. He was a senior administrator in the Territory of Papua (part of present-day Papua New Guinea) and also acted as administrator of the Northern Territory. He was also a Senator for Western Australia from 1901 to 1906.

Smith was born in Kingston, Victoria. He moved to Western Australia during the gold rushes and was mayor of Kalgoorlie from 1900 to 1901 as a self-proclaimed municipal socialist. Smith was elected as one of Western Australia's inaugural senators at the 1901 federal election, polling the most votes in the state. He served a single six-year term in the Senate, where he was known for his support of the White Australia policy and interest in Australian policy towards the Pacific Islands.

In 1907, Smith moved to the Territory of Papua. He filled the roles of director of agriculture, director of mines, director of public works and commissioner of lands, playing a key role in the development of the territory despite frequent clashes with the territory's lieutenant-governor Hubert Murray. As acting administrator he led an ill-fated expedition to the Gulf of Papua in 1910, although he was nonetheless awarded the Patron's Medal of the Royal Geographical Society. Smith volunteered for military service from 1916 to 1918 and was subsequently appointed as acting administrator of the Northern Territory, playing a key role in calming tensions after the Darwin Rebellion. He turned down the permanent position and remained in Papua until his retirement in 1930.

== Early life ==
Smith was born on 25 February 1869 in Kingston, Victoria. He was the son of English immigrants Margaret Gomersall (née Charlesworth) and William John Smith.

Smith was raised on his father's farming property. He attended a private school in St Arnaud until the age of sixteen, then moved to Melbourne where he received private tuition to pass his matriculation exam. He studied engineering at the University of Melbourne, but found job prospects were poor due to the depression of the early 1890s. He did not graduate and instead began working as a clerk for Goldsbrough Mort & Co.'s Melbourne office. In 1895, Smith moved to the Eastern Goldfields of Western Australia. He initially worked as a bookkeeper for a firm of produce merchants in Coolgardie, then in 1896 joined the Reuters Telegram Company as a manager in Kalgoorlie.

== Politics ==
=== Municipal politics ===
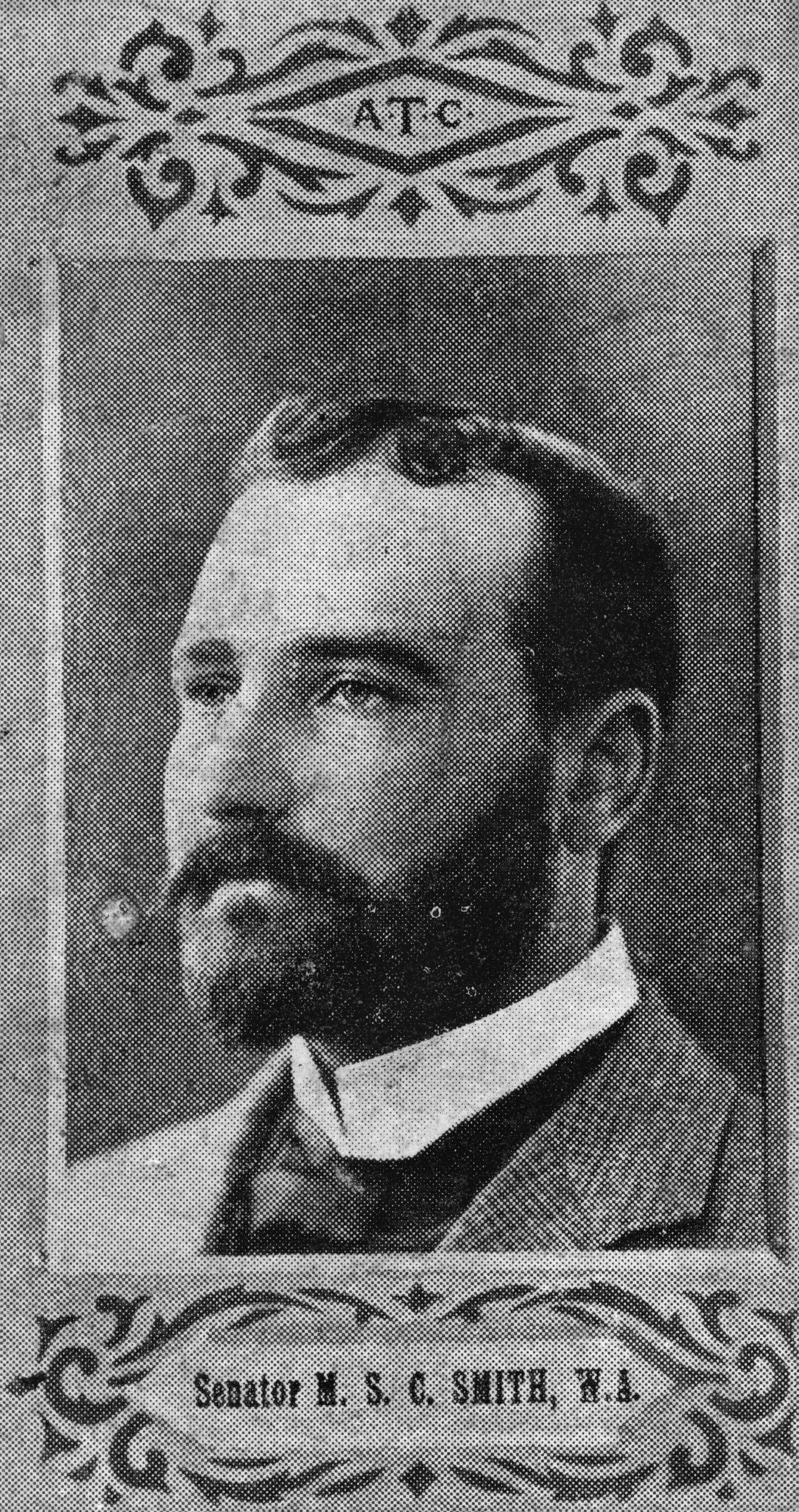
Tobacco card featuring Smith, c. 1901

Smith was elected to the Kalgoorlie Municipal Council in 1898 and served as mayor of Kalgoorlie from 1900 to 1901. He was an advocate for the construction of the Kalgoorlie tram network and helped create the Fresh Air League, a charity which organised excursions for underprivileged goldfields children to travel to the ocean. Smith was also involved in the creation of the council-funded Kalgoorlie City Markets building. He supported the idea of municipal socialism and in 1901 stated that he "believed in the application of the principles of socialism wherever they could be reasonably applied".

In December 1900, two weeks after being sworn in as mayor, Smith was at the centre of a contentious incident of racial discrimination when he instructed council officials to bar a Fijian swimmer, Sala Bogi, from competing at a swimming carnival to mark the opening of the Kalgoorlie Municipal Baths. Bogi was a British subject who was a member of the Kalgoorlie Swimming Club and had regularly competed in swimming and running events in Victoria. Smith justified the decision on the grounds that, while Bogi was a "decent and a clean man with whom he would readily go swimming", allowing his entry would set a precedent that would force the council to allow "Hindoos, Afghans or aboriginals" [sic] to swim alongside white residents. It has been suggested that he also saw the ban as a way to raise his public profile in anticipation of his candidacy for the new federal parliament, with the ban symbolising his support for a White Australia policy.

Smith's exclusion of Bogi was said to have attracted "caustic comment" from spectators and was viewed negatively by newspaper writers, with editorials and columns in The Sun, The Evening Star and Perth's Western Mail supporting Bogi's right to swim. Bogi unsuccessfully sought compensation from the council for depriving him of the opportunity to compete for prize money. In April 1901, he engaged local solicitor Norbert Keenan as his legal representative and sued Smith in the Kalgoorlie Local Court for tortious assault. His case was that his exclusion had caused him to fear violent retribution if he entered the baths, and that Smith had also defamed him by implying that he was unclean or diseased. The presiding magistrate non-suited Bogi's claim in May 1901 and awarded Smith costs. This may have been on the basis that Bogi had not given Smith the required notice of his suit, although contemporary newspaper reporting also suggested that the magistrate was motivated by racial prejudice. Keenan ultimately succeeded Smith as mayor in June 1901, following his election to the Senate, with the ban on Bogi being reversed.

=== Federal politics ===
Smith supported the federation movement and was elected to the Senate at the inaugural 1901 federal election, winning the most votes of any candidate in Western Australia. He joined the Free Trade Party but supported Chris Watson's Australian Labor Party (ALP) government in 1904. According to Brian De Garis, he sat "in opposition to the Barton and later Deakin governments, although he was sympathetic to much of the nation-building legislation, and indeed veered at times towards protectionist policies".

Smith was an active participant in the so-called "Papua debates", which focused on the anticipated incorporation of British New Guinea as a federal territory of Australia. In 1903 he conducted a study tour of tropical colonial administrations at his own cost, visiting Malaya, the Dutch East Indies, German New Guinea and the Solomon Islands. In the same year he published British New Guinea: with a Preface on Australia's Policy in the Pacific.

== Papua ==
He then became involved in Government Service in Papua, where in 1907 he was appointed Director of Agriculture and Mines. In 1910, Smith launched an expedition to explore the hinterland of the Gulf of Papua, seeking to cross from the Purari River to the Kikori River and eventually reach the Strickland River. He also sought to confirm reports from Donald Mackay of the existence of coal seams near Mount Murray., He and his party became lost and were feared dead for several weeks. Rescued with much publicity, he was hailed as an explorer and in 1923 awarded the Patron's Medal of the Royal Geographical Society.

In June 1907, only five weeks after his arrival, Smith established the Economic Museum in Port Moresby, the territory's first official museum. He also established experimental plantations, a laboratory and a herbarium.

== Military service ==
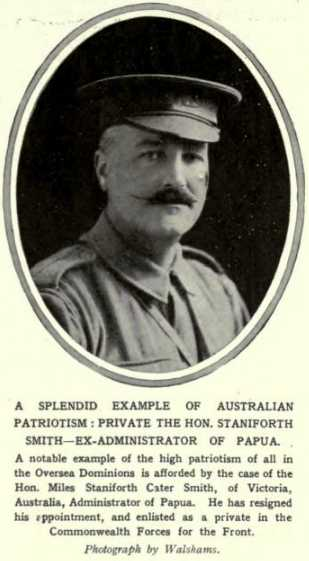
Staniforth Smith as a private soldier in 1916 (Illustrated War News)

In January 1916, Smith returned to Western Australia to volunteer for the Australian Imperial Force (AIF). He was 46 years old at the time of enlistment and "well over the age limit for active service". He was nonetheless accepted into officer training at the Royal Military College, Duntroon, but failed to pass the course and was instead appointed as a non-commissioned officer. He was sent to England in June 1916 as a warrant officer with the 44th Battalion.

After arriving in England, Smith completed further training and was commissioned as a second lieutenant, serving as a battalion intelligence officer. He received a fractured ankle at the Battle of Messines in June 1917 and was evacuated to England. He was subsequently deemed medically unfit for active service and spent the remainder of the war as a staff officer in the intelligence section of AIF Headquarters in London.

Smith used his political connections to lobby for Australian soldiers. In 1918 he wrote to defence minister George Pearce to urge that an Australian citizen be appointed to replace British general William Birdwood as AIF commander. Smith was appointed Member of the Order of the British Empire (MBE) in the 1919 Birthday Honours. After the war's end he published a short history of Australia's involvement through Macmillan, with a foreword by historian Ernest Scott.

== Northern Territory ==
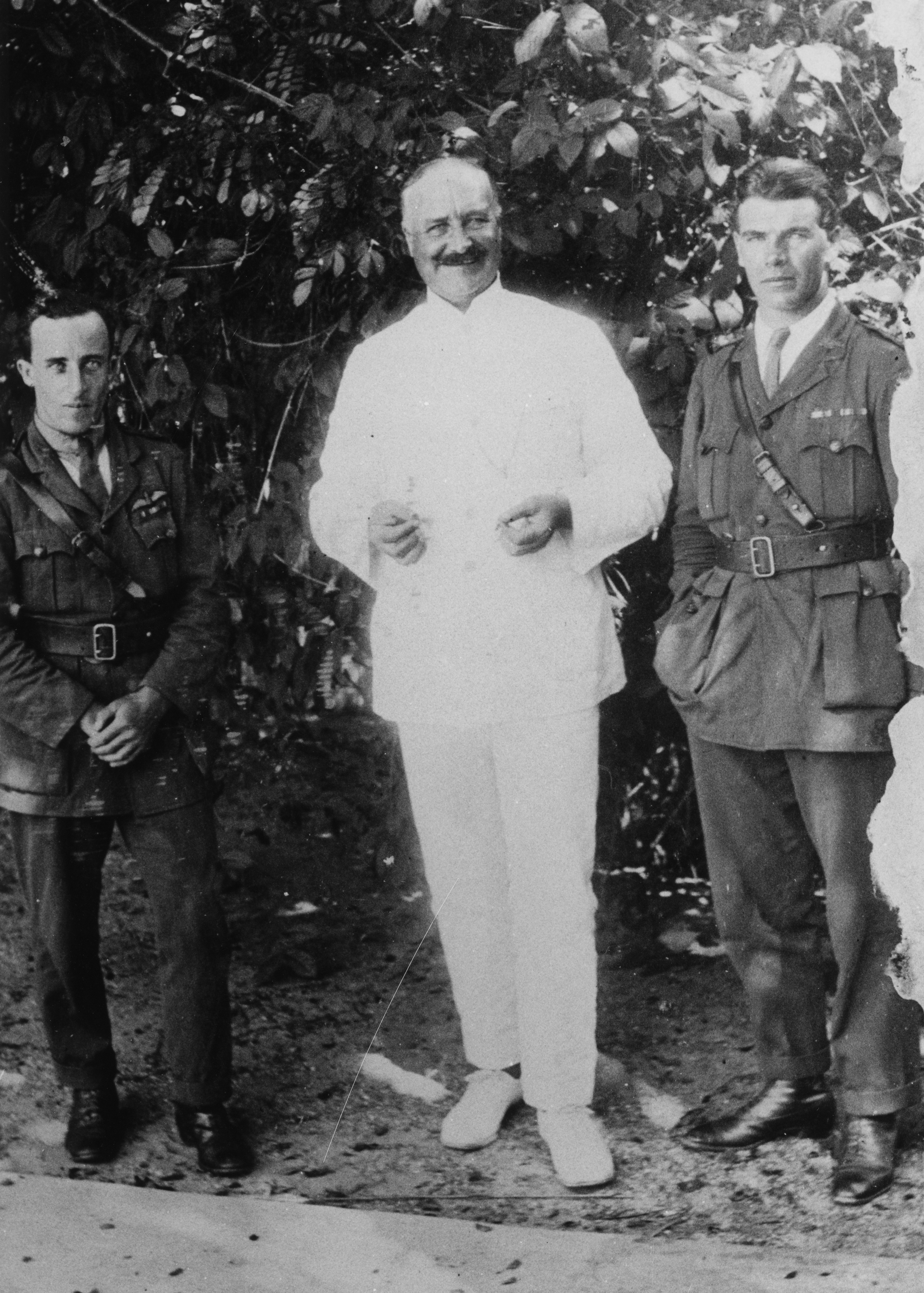
Smith (centre) in Darwin in 1920 with Great Air Race contestants Ray Parer (left) and John McIntosh

In 1911, following the assumption of federal control over the Northern Territory, Smith was a candidate to become the first federally appointed administrator of the Northern Territory. The position was instead given to John Gilruth, with Murray lobbying strongly against Smith's appointment and accusing him of "incompetence and of cruelty to the indigenous people".

The Darwin rebellion of late 1918 resulted in the effective expulsion of Gilruth from the territory over allegations of maladministration and corruption. Gilruth's deputy Henry Ernest Carey. After Carey's departure, the government offered the post of acting administrator to Smith as one of the few experienced colonial administrators. He accepted the position only after securing a commitment from Prime Minister Billy Hughes that the government would introduce legislation allowing for the representation of the Northern Territory in federal parliament, in the form of one senator with limited voting rights.

Smith's appointment took effect on 1 December 1919. He arrived in the capital Darwin alongside Norman Ewing, who had been appointed to lead the royal commission into the rebellion. Smith's "one concern was to ensure peace in the Territory". He investigated and resolved a number of the grievances that had led to the rebellion. He restored control of parklands to the Darwin Town Council.

In August 1920, Smith applied to be appointed administrator of the Northern Territory on a permanent basis. The following month, the federal government introduced the Northern Territory Representation Bill to provide for the representation of the territory in the Senate. The bill failed to pass, with a number of speakers arguing that representation in the House of Representatives would be more appropriate. The government did not move to resubmit an amended bill, despite Smith's expression of disappointment. He correspondingly withdrew his application for the administratorship in October 1920 and requested to return to his prior post in Papua.

== Personal life ==
In 1928, aged 59, Smith married Marjorie Mitchell, a niece of Western Australian premier James Mitchell. The couple had four children.

After retiring from government service in 1930, Smith took up farming at Kulikup, Western Australia. He died in Perth on 14 January 1934, aged 64, due to "chronic nephritis, uraemia and myocarditis".

== Memory ==
The Staniforth mountain range is named after him due to role he played in the passing of the Papua Act 1905 which saw the transfer of the territory of Papua from Britain to Australia.
