= Attercliffe Chapel =

Church in Sheffield, South Yorkshire, England

Coordinates: 53.3992°N 1.4271°W

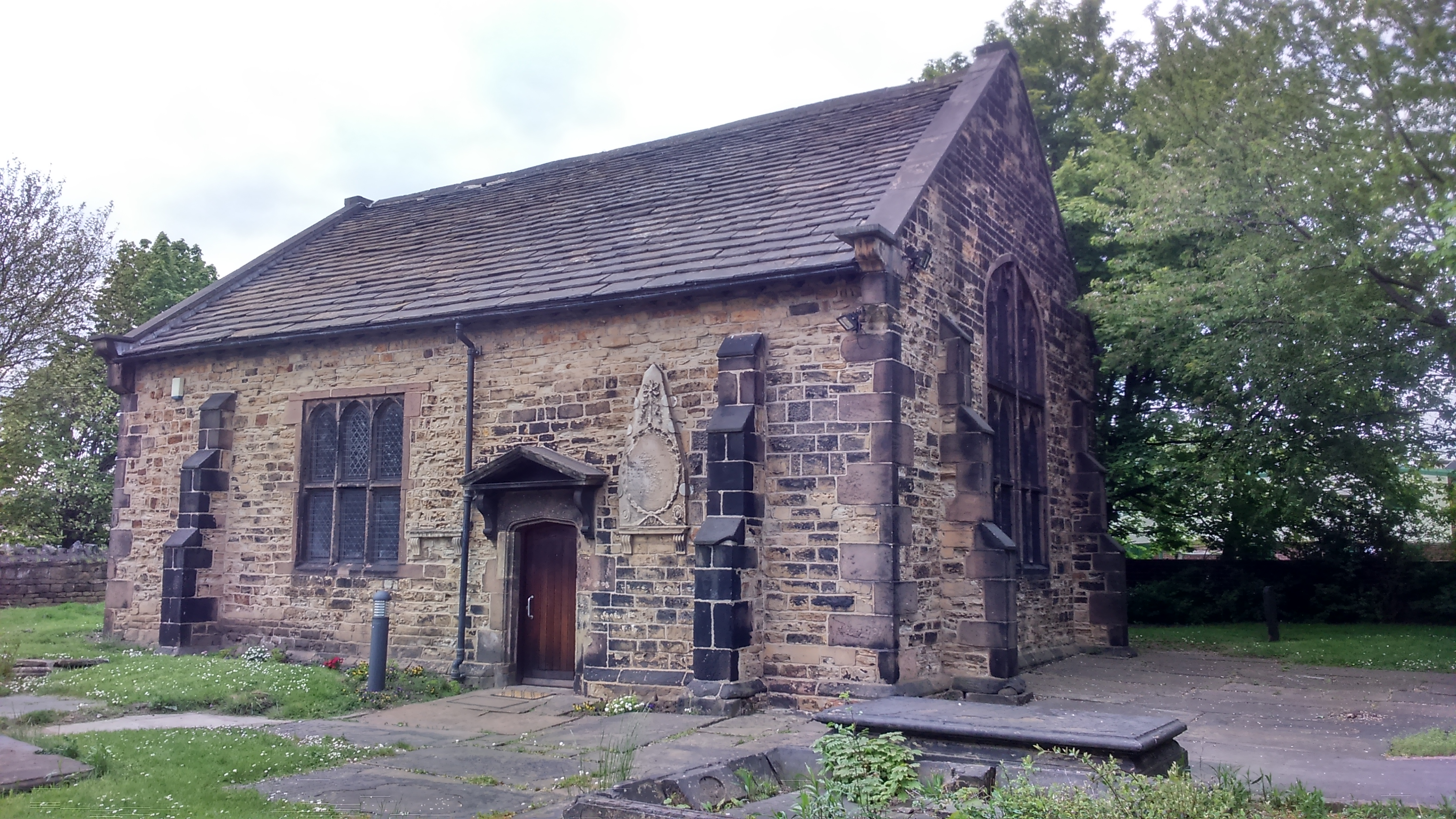
The chapel, seen from the south

Attercliffe Chapel, also known as the Hill Top Chapel, is a Gothic chapel in Attercliffe, now a suburb of Sheffield, South Yorkshire, England. The chapel was constructed in 1629, when Attercliffe was a township separate from Sheffield, although in the same parish. Consecration took place on St. Matthias' day, 24 February 1630.

By the 1840s, the chapel was used only for funeral services.

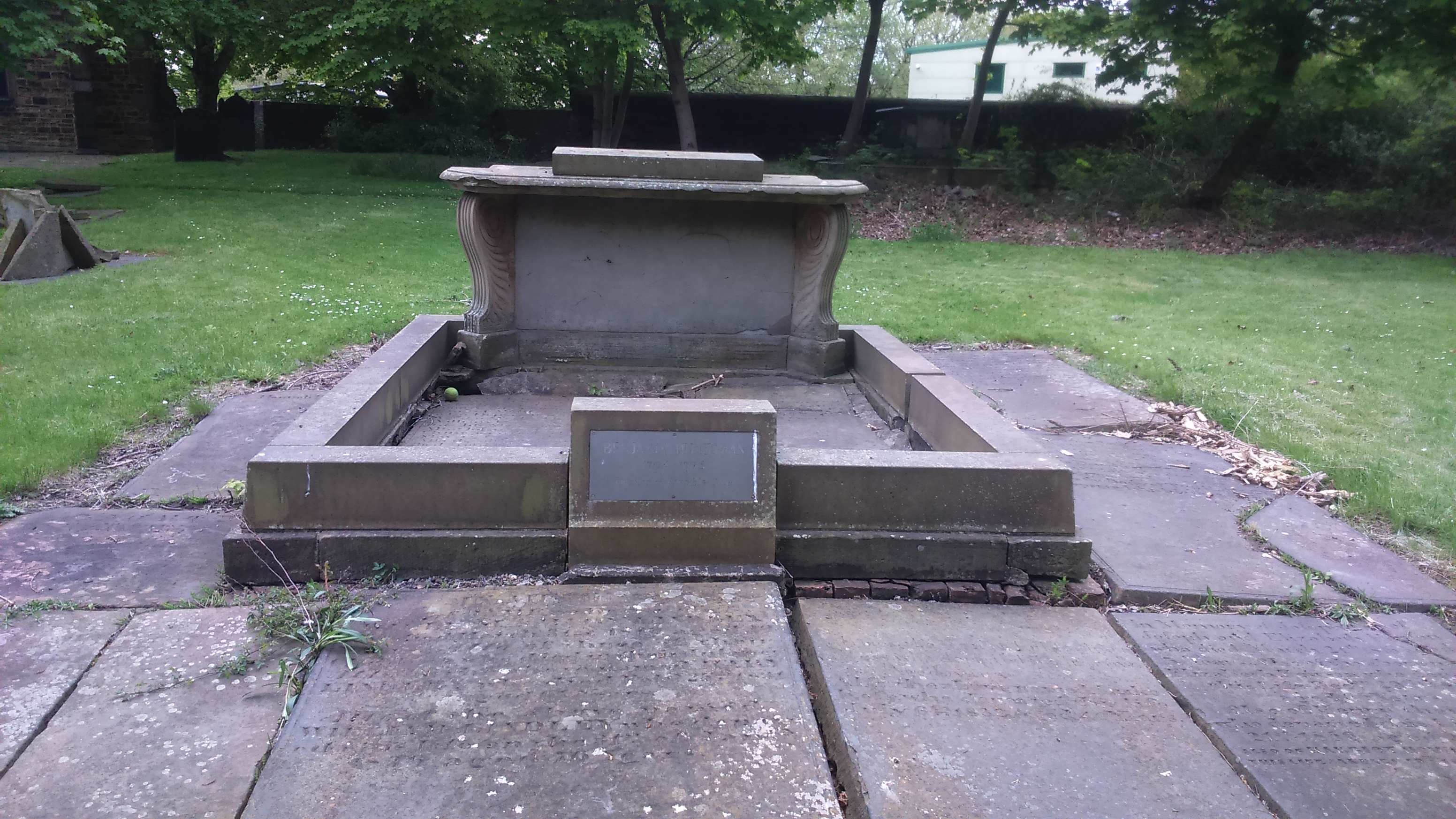
Tomb of Benjamin Huntsman, in the graveyard of the chapel

The chapel, surrounded by its cemetery, and lying on the south bank of the River Don, was largely rebuilt in 1909, but retains its period atmosphere. It is Grade II listed.

As of 2014, the Sheffield congregation of this Presbyterian Church began meeting at the chapel.

== Famous interments ==
- Benjamin Huntsman, inventor
- William Staniforth, surgeon

== In popular culture ==
The exterior of the chapel was a location used in the music video for Cabaret Voltaire's single "Sensoria". The video was directed by Peter Care and released in 1984.
