= Jonathan Salt (botanist) =

Jonathan Salt (1759–1815) was a cutler and local naturalist who catalogued plants growing in the Sheffield area.

He created a herbarium between 1773 and 1809, which provided the specimens for his Flora Sheffieldiensis. Although being used extensively by Frederick Arnold Lees in his The Flora of West Yorkshire with a sketch of the climatology and lithology in connection therewith (1888), the catalogue only existed in manuscript form until its publication in The Story of South Yorkshire Botany in 2011.

Salt's extensive herbarium is housed at Sheffield Museums Trust, alongside the manuscript copies of Flora Sheffieldiensis.

== Plants first recorded by Salt ==
Lees referenced a number of plants first identified by Salt: Some are listed here:

- Hordeum murinum or Wall Barley: First Record Salt, 1800
- Nardus stricta, or Matt-grass: First Record Salt, 1800
