= Sheffield and Tinsley Canal =

Canal in Sheffield, England

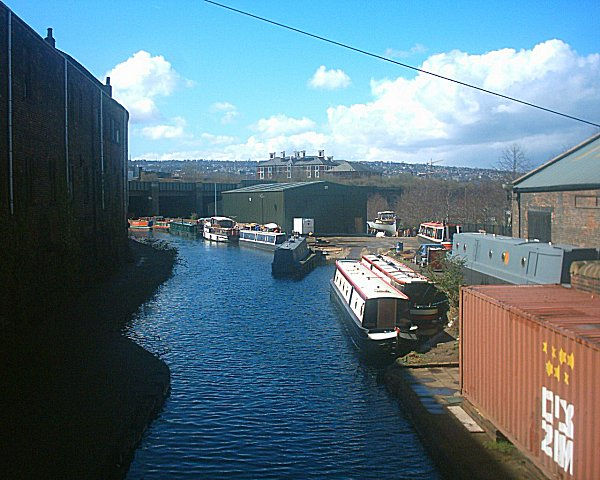
- Sheffield and Tinsley Canal boatyard at Cadman Street
- Interactive map of Sheffield and Tinsley Canal

Specifications
- Length: 3.9 miles (6.3 km)
- Maximum boat length: 61 ft 6 in (18.75 m)
- Maximum boat beam: 15 ft 6 in (4.72 m)
- Locks: 11 (originally 12)
- Status: Operational
- Navigation authority: Canal and River Trust

History
- Original owner: Sheffield Canal Company
- Date of act: 7 June 1815
- Date completed: 22 February 1819

Geography
- Start point: Sheffield
- End point: Tinsley
- Connects to: River Don Navigation

The Sheffield and Tinsley Canal (formally the Sheffield Canal) is a canal in the City of Sheffield, England. It runs 3.9 miles (6.3 km) from Tinsley, where it leaves the River Don, to the Sheffield Canal Basin (now Victoria Quays) in the city centre, passing through 11 locks. The maximum craft length that can navigate this lock system is 61 feet 6 inches (18.75 m) with a beam of 15 feet 6 inches (4.72 m).

== Early history ==
Sheffield is on the River Don, but the upper reaches of the river were not navigable. In medieval times, the goods from Sheffield had to be transported overland to the nearest inland port – Bawtry on the River Idle. Later, the lower reaches of the Don were made navigable, but boats could still not reach Sheffield. Proposals to link Sheffield to the navigable Don at Tinsley (and so to the Rivers Ouse and Trent, and to the Humber and the North Sea) were made as early as 1697, but these came to nothing.

By 1751 the River Don had been improved as far as Tinsley, but that was still 4 miles (6.4 km) short of Sheffield. The River Don Navigation maintained a wharf at Tinsley, and in 1788 they employed a surveyor to maintain the road from there to the city. The first moves to make a navigable connection to the city took place on 4 July 1792, when a public meeting was held at the Cutlers Hall. Those present subscribed £8,450 for an extension by the Don company, who went away to cost the project. They also wanted to build a canal to Beighton and Eckington, where there was coal and supplies of water. When they presented a proposal three weeks later, it was for a canal from Sheffield to Brinsworth, near Rotherham, including a branch to Renishaw near Eckington. Meanwhile, the Dearne and Dove Canal project was underway, and doubts were expressed about the needs to serve a mining area once that came online. However, John Thompson, their engineer, thought that it would be difficult to supply enough water for the locks without a branch towards Eckington.

A committee meeting was held in Sheffield on 6 December 1792, at which the Chesterfield Canal objected to the Eckington Branch, as they felt that coal in that area should use their canal, and the Duke of Norfolk agreed to terms, which were a lot higher than the committee had expected. They estimated that it would cost £46,292 for a 4-mile (6.4 km) canal from Sheffield to Rotherham, with a 10-mile (16 km) branch to Eckington and a further 2-mile (3.2 km) branch to the Duke of Norfolk's colliery at Attercliffe Common. They recommended to the shareholders that they should implement the whole scheme, or that the Eckington Branch should be built by a separate subscription. A public meeting held on 15 January 1793 adopted the idea, including a separate subscription for the Eckington Branch, and the engineer Benjamin Outram was asked to produce a report.

Outram proposed a 12.75-mile (20.52 km) canal build on one level from the Eckington to Beighton Road to near the hospital in Sheffield, passing through Attercliffe on its route. In order to keep it level, a 770-yard (700 m) tunnel and several major cuttings would be required. The section from the Don to Attercliffe would be suitable for river barges, while the section beyond Attercliffe to the Chesterfield Canal would be a narrow canal. Five locks would be needed between Eckington and the Chesterfield Canal, with seven canal locks and three river locks to complete the route to Tinsley wharf. The total estimated cost would be £52,216, but times were hard, and no immediate action was taken.

In 1801, the inhabitants of Sheffield wrote to the Don Navigation Company, asking them to extend the canal into Sheffield. While they considered this, and the need for back pumping because of the lack of a water supply, the Cutlers Company asked William Dunn to survey a line from Sheffield to Tinsley, which he did in early 1802. It included nine locks, with a deep summit pound to act as a reservoir, and suggested that other reservoirs might be needed. A plan for the work was deposited in Parliament. The Don Navigation were surprised by this action, and decided to oppose it, on the grounds that they would suffer loss as a result of it, but the Cutlers Company thought they would gain from it, and refused to make an offer. The Duke of Norfolk opposed the bill in Parliament, and the Cutlers' scheme was wound up.

The Cutlers Company took the initiative again in 1813, when they asked William Chapman to survey lines between Sheffield and Rotherham, both to the north and to the south of the Don. Chapman preferred the northern route, and the Cutlers asked the Don Navigation if they wanted to build this canal, but the shareholders declined. They told the Cutlers that if they built their canal, the Don Navigation would want compensation, and to be released from their obligation to maintain the road from Tinsley into Sheffield. They agreed on a payment of £11,000, which seems to have included the sale of at least one lock to the Cutlers. Having agreed terms, they changed their plans on 15 July 1814, electing for a route to the south of the Don, partly to access the Duke of Norfolk's Handsworth Colliery, and partly because it would be easier to link to the Chesterfield Canal in the future. The scheme was costed at £55,510, including a branch towards Darnall, three reservoirs, and a steam engine to pump water from collieries.

== The 19th century ==
Sheffield Canal Act 1815
- Act of Parliament
- Parliament of the United Kingdom
- Long title: An Act for making and maintaining a Navigable Canal from Sheffield to Tinsley, in the West Riding of the County of York.
- Citation: 55 Geo. 3. c. lxv

Dates
- Royal assent: 7 June 1815

Text of statute as originally enacted

In 1815, the Sheffield Canal Company was formed by the Sheffield Canal Act 1815 (55 Geo. 3. c. lxv) in order to construct a canal.

The surveyors' recommended route was to leave the River Don at Jordan's Lock, opposite where the "Holmes Cut" of the Don Navigation joins the river and follow the north side of the Don Valley to a basin "in or near Savile Street". When this was put forward the Duke of Norfolk's estate noted that it would preclude coal from their collieries at Tinsley Park and Manor reaching the canal and as the Duke was the largest financial backer of the project an alternative should be sought more favourable to their cause.

The alternative route was on the south side of the Don Valley, to terminate at a basin on the site of the former orchards of Sheffield Castle. This would require two series of locks, one, at Tinsley to raise the level from the river and a second, at Carbrook, to gain the necessary height for a level flow into the city centre. It was suggested that a short branch, known as "The Greenland Arm" should be built to afford access to Tinsley Park Collieries. Although the longer and more expensive option, the Duke's support meant that this route was the one for which parliamentary approval was sought.

The act of Parliament was passed on 7 June 1815 with 182 subscribers, the Duke of Norfolk (2,000) and the Earl Fitzwilliam (1,000) being the largest contributors. The civil engineer William Chapman had prepared the plans, and he became the Engineer for the project, which would cost £76,000. The foundation stone of the canal basin was laid by Hugh Parker of Woodthorpe Hall on 16 June 1816 and all was ready for opening less than three years later.

== Opening ==
When it opened on 22 February 1819 a general holiday was called and crowds of spectators, reportedly 60,000, gathered to watch the first boats, a flotilla of 10 arrive from Tinsley. Within the flotilla was one barge of coal brought from Handsworth Colliery – the first cargo to travel the canal. By 1820 boat-building had been established at the canal wharf, with the first 'sloop' being launched in October 1820.

== Early services ==
By 1840 the city could boast a service second to none; services to Greasbrough ran in connection with the twice weekly "fly-boat", which itself ran in connection with the Hull and London steamers. Richard Preston & Company offered a "fly-boat" service to Thorne for onward transshipment, whilst the London and Sheffield Union Company offered a service "without transshipment" to the capital. Other services ran to Gainsborough (fortnightly) and Leeds (every three weeks). Only five years on and the first major change came about when William Cobby offered water transport from London to Hull and Selby with onward forwarding to Sheffield by rail.

== Canal wagonways ==
From its earliest days the canal basin and the Greenland Arm were served by wagonways which brought coal from the many local collieries to the canal for onward shipment. The canal basin was served by lines connecting to the collieries on the Duke of Norfolk in the Manor area whilst the Greenland Arm was reached by lines from collieries in Tinsley Park and High Hazels.

== The coming of the railways ==
Sheffield Canal Purchase Act 1848
- Act of Parliament
- Parliament of the United Kingdom
- Long title: An Act for vesting in the Manchester, Sheffield, and Lincolnshire Railway Company the Sheffield Canal.
- Citation: 11 & 12 Vict. c. xciv

Dates
- Royal assent: 22 July 1848

Text of statute as originally enacted

Sheffield Canal Transfer Act 1849
- Act of Parliament
- Parliament of the United Kingdom
- Long title: An Act to transfer the Sheffield Canal to the Company of Proprietors of the Navigation of the River Dun.
- Citation: 12 & 13 Vict. c. lxxv

Dates
- Royal assent: 28 July 1849

Text of statute as originally enacted

In 1846 there was a move by the long titled Sheffield, Rotherham, Barnsley, Wakefield, Hull and Goole Railway to acquire the Sheffield Canal Company and provide itself with a city terminus. Before this deal could be completed the Sheffield and Lincolnshire Junction Railway (S&LJR) came in with an offer which was accepted. The S&LJR became part of the Manchester, Sheffield and Lincolnshire Railway (MS&LR) and on 22 July 1848 they became the owners of the canal by the Sheffield Canal Purchase Act 1848 (11 & 12 Vict. c. xciv). The canal was transferred to the River Dun Navigation Company by the Sheffield Canal Transfer Act 1849 (12 & 13 Vict. c. lxxv) of 28 July 1849 where it was joined by the Stainforth and Keadby Canal and the Dearne and Dove Canal. After fusion with the South Yorkshire, Doncaster and Goole Railway it became the South Yorkshire Railway and River Dun Navigation Company. The South Yorkshire Railway passed to the MS&LR and they again became the canal's owners.

== Canal amalgamation ==
In 1895 the Sheffield Canal was amalgamated with the River Don Navigation and the Stainforth and Keadby Canal to form the Sheffield and South Yorkshire Navigation. The following year the facilities at Sheffield were modernised and a new warehouse built straddling the basin.

== Post First World War and future plans ==
The government took control of the canals during the First World War and no maintenance was undertaken. After the war, in October 1918, the city council and local business met and decided to press the government to nationalise the canals and pay the costs of repairs. In principle they would be willing to contribute to "Free the canal of railway interference". In 1920 the Transport Committee of the city council received several plans for the canal. Within the city these included the construction at Tinsley, adjacent to Tinsley station, of a new basin to serve the eastern side of Sheffield and to retain and improve the canal basin to serve the more general and lighter trades of the city centre. The city council was unwilling to go ahead with these works without government backing which was not forthcoming, however in 1925 a new grain silo was erected alongside the canal by, and for the use of Samuel Smith (Sheffield) Limited, based on Carlisle Street. Before this they had received the grain in sacks which were transferred by horse dray from the canal basin, the weight being such that an extra horse was added to haul the dray up Spital Hill to reach Carlisle Street.

In December 1940, lock 6 of the Tinsley flight was hit by a bomb dropped as part of the Second World War bombing campaign against British cities, and suffered considerable damage. A plaque nearby records the efforts of the workers who reconstructed the lock in difficult circumstances.

== Nationalisation and afterwards ==
The canals, including the Sheffield Canal, were nationalised in 1948 but traffic, although many efforts were made, showed little increase and that only temporary. In 1960 the British Waterways Board informed the City Council that they intended to make Thrybergh the new waterhead, the site being alongside the proposed new British Steel Corporation's bar mill. In 1961 the BWB opened their new warehouse at Rotherham, almost opposite the confluence of the River Rother with the Don, and this became the waterhead.

== The end in sight ==
In early July 1980 the Sheffield Canal received its first commercial cargo in 10 years but this was not a beginning, more a finale. Plans were put forward in the early 1980s by both the Sheffield City Council and British Waterways. The decision from the Environment Minister was eagerly awaited and it was not until the 1990s that the canal basin was restored and renamed Victoria Quays.

== Engineering ==
There were originally twelve locks in the Tinsley flight, which rises 70 feet (21 m) but in order to accommodate a new railway bridge, locks 7 and 8 were combined in 1959, with a single concrete chamber replacing both of them. The modern numbering scheme has locks 1 to 6, 7/8 and 9 to 12. Water for the top pound, and hence the locks, is pumped from a small building situated below Tinsley Viaduct. This originally housed a steam engine to drive the pumps, but this was replaced by a duty and standby 125 hp diesel engine in 1918. The pumps supply 3,500 gallons per minute (265 L/s) to an outlet near the top lock of the flight.

== Towpath ==
In 2014, work was completed on improvements to the canal towpath; the Sheffield & Tinsley Canal Towpath Trail now forms part of a walking route, known as the Blue Loop, from Meadowhall Shopping Centre into Sheffield city centre, alongside the Five Weirs Walk which follows the River Don upstream into the city centre. The towpath also connects at Meadowhall with a walking route along the river and the canals of the River Don Navigation into Rotherham town centre.

== Listed buildings ==
The route of the canal features several listed buildings. They include the Terminal Warehouse and Grain Warehouse at Victoria Quays, Bacon Lane Bridge, Cadman Street Bridge and Darnall Canal Aqueduct.

== Canal on film ==
The Sheffield and Tinsley Canal featured in the opening scene of the 1997 film The Full Monty. This clip was part of a Sheffield City Council publicity film entitled "Sheffield, City on the Move" made some 30 years before.

== Points of interest ==
Point	Coordinates (Links to map resources)	OS Grid Ref	Notes
Lock 12	53.4180°N 1.3992°W	SK400914	Jn with River Don
M1 motorway Tinsley viaduct	53.4142°N 1.4029°W	SK397909	
Lock 7/8 by railway bridge	53.4082°N 1.4062°W	SK395903	
Lock 1	53.4037°N 1.4113°W	SK392898	Top of Tinsley flight
Worksop Road Aqueduct	53.3936°N 1.4251°W	SK383886	Top of Tinsley flight
Sheffield Basin	53.3847°N 1.4594°W	SK360876	
