= B roads in Zone 6 of the Great Britain numbering scheme =

The numbering zones for roads in Great Britain

B roads are numbered routes in Great Britain of lesser importance than A roads. See the article Great Britain road numbering scheme for the rationale behind the numbers allocated.

== Zone 6 (3 digits) ==
Road	From	To	Notes
B600	Alfreton	Nuthall, Nottingham	Previously the A613
B601	Lobley Hill Interchange, A1	A184 in Gateshead	Possible number for the former A692 west of Gateshead. The eastern end is now part of the A184, but it is not known if the B601 was decommissioned as well. Some maps and all signs state the route as part of the B1426, however other maps, as well as Gateshead MBC, still state the route as B601.
~~B602~~	unused		
B603 (defunct)			Briefly proposed in early 2013 for the section of the A6033 between Hebden Bridge and Haworth, returned to the A6033 designation.
~~B604~~ - ~~B629~~	unused		
B630	B6318 at Greenhead	A69 near Greenhead	
~~B631~~ - ~~B639~~	unused		
B640	A606 at Barleythorpe	Oakham	
B641	A6003 south of Oakham	Oakham	
~~B642~~ - ~~B644~~	unused		
B645	Higham Ferrers	B1048 at St Neots	
~~B646~~ - ~~B649~~	unused		
B650 (defunct)	A6 in South Mimms	A111 in Potters Bar	Became an extension of the A111 (now B556) by the 1970s.
B651	A1081 at St Albans	B656 near Rush Green	
B652	B653 near Harpenden	B651 at Kimpton	
B653	Luton	B197 near Welwyn Garden City	
B654 (defunct)	A6 in Luton	A601 in Luton	Now part of the A6.
B655	Barton-le-Clay	Hitchin	
B656	Letchworth	A505 at Clothall Common	Formerly part of the A505. Original route ran through Willian.
B657 (defunct)	A601 (later A505) in Letchworth	Letchworth railway station	Declassified sometime after the 1970s.
B658	A600 near Shefford	Biggleswade North Roundabout	
B659	Henlow	Biggleswade	Originally ran along Eastcotts Road in Fenlake, Bedford. Renumbered to a spur of the B562 around 1935.
B660	Bedford	Ramsey St Mary's	Starts in Bedford, Bedfordshire, crosses the A14 & the A1(M), ends in Cambridgeshire where it intersects with the B1040.
B661	Great Staughton	A1 at Buckden	
B662	A605	B660 near Old Weston	
B663	Bythorn	Caldecott	
B664	A427 near Market Harborough	Uppingham	First used at Irthlingborough, cutting the corner between the A6 and B663. It was upgraded to Class I status early on and had become part of the A605 by the 1950s (probably had this number by the end of the 1920s). But following the construction of the current A45, the road was torn up and is now completely gone, nothing more than a faint line in a field. The second use was from the A43 north of Stanion to the A427 in Corby. Upgraded to Class I status as the A6116 in 1935; the section east of Corby is now part of the A6086 and the remainder unclassified.
B665 (defunct)	A604 in Thrapston	B663 near Raunds	Upgraded to a portion of the A605 before 1930. Later bypassed by the current A45; much of route now unclassified, except for a small section in Raunds which is now part of the B663.
B666 (defunct)	B663 in Raunds	B665 in Ringstead	Became a spur of the B663 by the 1950s, but was likely renumbered before then.
B667	A6030 near Evington	A47 near Thurncourt	First used between Islip and Stanion; this was upgraded to the A6116 by the end of the 1920s. Next used between Humberstone and Thurmaston. The central section is part of the A563 Leicester northern bypass and the remainder unclassified.
B667	A607 south of Thurmaston	A607 north of Thurmaston	Former routing of the A46 through Thurmaston. Duplicated number.
B668	Oakham	A1 at Stretton	
B669	Desborough	Wilbarston	
B670	Cottingham, Northamptonshire	A6003 at Rockingham	
B671	Wansford, Cambridgeshire (A47 road)	Elton Hall (A605 road)	
B672	A6003 at Caldecott	A47 near Morcott	
B673 (defunct)	A606 in Rutland	B668 in Rutland	Now a spur of the B668.
B673 (defunct)	A607 in Syston	A6 in Wanlip Hill	Declassified following the construction of the A46 Leicester Northern Bypass and A607 Syston Bypass; the western half is now part of the A46.
B674 (defunct)	A6 in Mountsorrel	B6047 in Twyford	Declassified after the Mountsorrel, Syston and Rearsby bypasses were built.
B675 (defunct)	A60 at Hoton, Leicestershire	Former A6 at Quorn, Leicestershire	Now declassified, no longer a B road
B676	A60 at Cotes, Leicestershire	A1 at Colsterworth, Lincolnshire	In two sections; uses A6006 between Melton Mowbray and a point near Old Dalby, Leicestershire – truncated at eastern end, used to run to Bourne, Lincolnshire, now A151 and B1193
B677 (defunct)	A607 in Grantham	A1 (now B1174)/A152 (now A52) in Grantham	Became a spur of the A607 sometime after the 1990s.
B678 (defunct)	A1 (now A52) in Grantham	Grantham wharf	Much of route now part of the A52 except for the section west of the A607 to the wharf which is now unclassified.
B679	A60 in West Bridgford	A453 at Silverdale, Nottinghamshire	Formerly part of the A648
B680	A60 at Ruddington, Nottinghamshire	B679 at Wilford, Nottinghamshire	
B681 (defunct)	A52 in Nottingham	A60 in Nottingham	Nottingham western bypass; the southern section became part of the A453 (now A6005) around 1935 while the remainder held on through the 1960s before it too was upgraded to Class I status, and is now the A6130.
B682	A6130 near Hyson Green	A6002 at Bulwell	
B683	A60 south of Mansfield	A611 north of Nottingham	
B684	A60 north-east of Nottingham city centre	A614 near Dorket Head	
B685 (defunct)	A612 (now B686) in Nottingham	B686 in Nottingham	One section became a portion of the A612 in the 1990s and the remainder was declassified.
B686	A612 east of Nottingham city centre	A6211 at Gedling	
B687 (defunct)	A52 in Bingham	A46 in Newton	Declassified, probably in the 1980s.
B688 (defunct)	A46 east of East Bridgford	A614 in Warren Hill	The southern section between the A46 and A612 was upgraded to Class I status early on, becoming the A6097, although much of this section returned to the B688 after the East Bridgford bypass and a new Gunthorpe Bridge (opened 1927) were built (the new road got the A6097 number). With the old bridge gone, this left the B688 with a gap over the River Trent, requiring a detour via local roads and the A6097. Later maps showed that the A6097 had replaced the B688 piece by piece. A section in Oxton was numbered as part of the B6386, but this is now unclassified.
B689 (defunct)	A1 (now B6326) in Newark-on-Trent	A46 in Newark-on-Trent	Was the highest-numbered and northernmost 3-digit road B road in England. Upgraded to Class I status, either as a spur of the A46 or an out-of-zone extension of the A17. Now part of the B6166 after Newark was bypassed by the A1 and A46.
B690	B6004 near Bilborough	A610 at Bobbers Mill	Originally ran from south of Brington to Glatton. Renumbered as an extension of the B660 in 1935.
B691	A1081 at St Albans city centre	A1057 east of St Albans city centre	
B692	Saxondale Roundabout at the A52	Margidunum Roundabout at the A6097	Former section of the A46
~~B693~~ - ~~B699~~	unused		

== B6000 to B6099 ==
Road	From	To	Notes
B6000	A6 at Pride Parkway flyover, Derby	A5194, London Road, Derby	via Derby railway station.
B6001	A619 north of Bakewell	A6187 at Hathersage	
B6002	B5010 at Sandiacre	B6450 at Long Eaton railway station	
B6003	Stapleford, Nottinghamshire	Chilwell	
B6004	Arnold, Nottinghamshire	Stapleford, Nottinghamshire	Between Bilborough and Stapleford, Nottinghamshire merges with the A6002
B6005 (defunct)	A52 in Bramcote	B6003 in Stapleford	Became a portion of the A6007 in 1971.
B6005 (defunct)	A57 in Worksop	A616 north of Budby	Originally the A6009 before it was downgraded in 1971. Became a northern extension of the B6034 after the A57 Worksop bypass was built; the bypassed section as well as the section north of the A57 are now unclassified.
B6006	A52 at Bramcote Hills	Beeston	
B6007	A609 in Ilkeston	A6007 in Ilkeston	Bypassed by A6007
B6008	Bilborough	Bulwell	
B6009	Hucknall	Watnall	
B6010	Kimberley	Greasley	
B6011	Hucknall	A60 at Burntstump Hill	
B6012	Rowsley	Baslow	Originally numbered B6043, it was upgraded to the A623 in the 1930s including the formerly private road through Chatsworth Park. It gained its present number in the 1970s.
B6013	Belper	Shirland	
B6014	Mansfield	Tansley	
B6015 (defunct)	B6014 in Matlock	A619 Chatsworth Road west of Chesterfield	Upgraded to Class I status as the A632 in the 1970s. May also have been used in Sheffield but this is unconfirmed.
B6016	Lower Hartshay	Selston	
B6017	Leabrookes	Somercotes	Short link road between B6016 and B600
B6018	Sutton in Ashfield	Selston	
B6019	Alfreton	Kirkby in Ashfield	
B6020	Kirkby in Ashfield	Rainworth	
B6021	Sutton in Ashfield	Annesley	
B6022	A38 in Sutton in Ashfield	B6139 in Sutton in Ashfield	
B6023	Intersection with A38 and A6075 east of Sutton in Ashfield	A38 west of Sutton in Ashfield	Part of the A38 through Sutton until bypassed.
B6024	Worksop	Roundabout with A57 and A60	Part of A60 until bypassed by A57
B6025	A61 north of Alfreton	Tibshelf	
B6026	Sutton in Ashfield	Tibshelf	
B6027	A38	Huthwaite	
B6028	Sutton in Ashfield	Stanton Hill	
B6029 (defunct)	Whinny Hill	B6021 near Skegby	This was rerouted twice and became the A6075 with the western section later becoming part of the A617 in 2004. There may have been a later B6029 in Newark but this is unconfirmed.
B6030	Mansfield	A614 south of Ollerton	
B6031	Church Warsop	B6407 east of Shirebrook	
B6032	A60 in Mansfield Woodhouse	A6075 in Mansfield Woodhouse	
B6033	Mansfield	Forest Town	
B6034	Worksop	Rufford	Uses the A616 for part of its route.
B6035	Warsop	A6075	
B6036	Kelstedge	B6014 near Stretton	
B6037 (defunct)	A61 in Clay Cross	A617 in Heath	Upgraded to Class I status after the M1 was built, becoming the A6175 in the 1970s.
B6038	North Wingfield	Hasland	
B6039	Chesterfield	Tibshelf	
B6040	Roundabout with A57	Gateford	A57 through Worksop until bypassed.
B6041	Manton	Gateford	Goes round northern suburbs of Worksop
B6042	A60 west of Welbeck Abbey	Creswell	Rerouted by approximately 150m to the north in 2006/7 to minimise the impact of traffic on Creswell Crags
B6043	Whitwell Common	A619 east of Whitwell	A619 branch road through Whitwell. Between 1922 and 1935, the route of the B6043 and A619 were the opposite way around in Whitwell.
B6044	A638 in Retford	Retford railway station	
B6045	Worksop	Drakeholes	
B6046 (defunct)	A6 Loughborough Road in Quorndon	B675 in Quorndon	Declassified due to completion of the A6 bypass.
B6047	A607 at Melton Mowbray	A4304 at Market Harborough	By way of Great Dalby, Thorpe Satchville, Twyford, Tilton on the Hill and Tur Langton
B6048	A619 north of Bakewell	B6012 north of Edensor	
B6049	Blackwell in the Peak	Brough-on-Noe	
B6050	Chesterfield	A619 east of Baslow	
B6051	Chesterfield	A621 at Owler Bar	
B6052	Chesterfield	Eckington	
B6053	Staveley	Beighton	
B6054	Highlane	Calver	Uses A6102 as part of the route. Western section past Owler Bar now A625.
B6055 (defunct)	B6054 at Totley Moor	A625 near Fox House Inn	The southern half (south of the B6150) became part of a rerouted A625 and the northern half became a spur of the A6187 in 1999.
B6056	Eckington	Dronfield Woodhouse	
B6057	Chesterfield	Dronfield	Part of A61 until bypassed.
B6058	Mosborough	Killamarsh	
B6059	South Anston	Wales, South Yorkshire	
B6060	South Anston	Wickersley	
B6061 (defunct)	A623 at Sparrowpit	A625 at Mam Tor	Declassified in the 1990s.
B6062	A6 near Whaley Bridge	A624 north of Chapel en le Firth	Part of A625 before it was rerouted and bypassed by A6
B6063	A6135 in Gleadless, South Yorkshire	Gleadless	
B6064	Gleadless	Orgreave, South Yorkshire	
B6065	Gleadless	Handsworth	
B6066	Woodhouse	Catcliffe	
B6067	A57	Brinsworth	
B6068	Beauchief	Ecclesall	
B6069	Sheffield	Fulwood	
B6070	City Road (A6135) in Sheffield	Burngreave Road (A6135) in Sheffield	Via A61 in Sheffield
B6071	Farm Bridge (A61), Sheffield	B6073, Attercliffe, Sheffield	Shrewsbury Road, Talbot Street, Bernard Road
B6072 (defunct)	A616 Duke Street, Sheffield	B6071 Bernard Road/Bernard Street, Sheffield	Declassified.
B6073	Exchange Place (A61), Sheffield	Attercliffe Road (A6178), Attercliffe, Sheffield	
B6074	Wicker (A6109), Sheffield	Penistone Road (A61)	Nursery Street, Neepsend Lane
B6075	Sheaf Square, Sheffield	Fitzalan Square, Sheffield	Pond Street, Flat Street
B6076	Malin Bridge	Low Holdworth	West Route
B6077	Malin Bridge	Low Holdworth	East Route
B6078 (defunct)	B6079 Catch Bar Lane, Sheffield	A629 (now A61) Penistone Road, Sheffield	Ran along Leppings Lane; renumbered as a portion of the B6079. The section north of the B6079 is now part of the A6102 while the southernmost section (which never had the B6078 number) is now an unclassified one-way street.
B6079	Worksop	A1 at Ranby	
B6080	A6178 in Sheffield	B6082 in Sheffield	
B6081	Sheffield	Heeley	
B6082	Sheffield	Concord Park	
B6083	A6178	B6082	
B6084 (defunct)	A61 (now A6135) Barnsley Road, North Sheffield	A630 (now A6178), Attercliffe Common	Due to its importance as a Sheffield northern bypass, it was upgraded to Class I status as a portion of the A6102.
B6085	A6178 in Attercliffe, Sheffield	A6102 in Darnall	Darnall Road
B6086	Wincobank	Harley, South Yorkshire	
B6087	Parson Cross	Ecclesfield	
B6088	A616 west of Stocksbridge	A6102 east of Stocksbridge	Was A616 until bypassed.
B6089	Rotherham	Brampton	
B6090	Hooton Roberts	Harley	
B6091	Nether Haugh	Hoober	
B6092	Swinton	Low Stubbin	
B6093	Hooton Roberts	Bramley	
B6094	Conisbrough	Wadworth	
B6095 (defunct)	A60 (now A630) Cleveland Street, Doncaster	A1 (later A638) Hall Gate	Declassified due to road upgrades in Doncaster; the route is now split in two by the A638.
B6096	Hoyland	Darfield	
B6097	Hoyland	Wath upon Dearne	
B6098	A6023 at Dearne Valley College	A635 in Goldthorpe	Route into Goldthorpe is a former routing of the A635.
B6099	Dodworth	Kingston	

== B6100 to B6199 ==
Road	From	To	Notes
B6100	Kendray	Worsbrough Bridge	
B6101	Marple	New Mills	
B6102	Marple	Marple	
B6103 (defunct)	A6 in Hazel Grove	A560 in Woodley	Upgraded to Class I status as a southern extension of the A627 in the 1970s.
B6104	Romiley	Marple Bridge	
B6105	Glossop	Crowden	
B6106	Holmfirth	Millhouse Green	
B6107	Holmfirth	Marsden	
B6108	Armitage Bridge	Meltham	
B6109	Slaithwaite	B6107 south of Slaithwaite	
B6110	Armitage Rd. Huddersfield	Armitage Bridge	
B6112	Salterhebble	Outlane	part of the road was formerly the A6026
B6113	West Vale	Ripponden	
B6114	Rastrick	Scammonden	most of the road was formerly the A6025
B6116	Kirkburton	Scissett	
B6128	Horbury	A662 northwest of Dewsbury	by way of Ossett
B6129	B6128 in Ossett	A638 at Shepherd Hill	
B6130	Shadsworth, Blackburn	Intack, Blackburn	Part of the Blackburn Ring Road Originally ran from Ossett Street Side to Chidswell. Declassified around 1935 when the B6129 was extended along a parallel route.
B6136	Castleford	Knottingley	
B6137	Garforth	A1 road near Kippax	
B6138	Mytholmroyd	Blackstone Edge	
B6139	A38 at Sutton in Ashfield	B6020 at Ravenshead	Originally ran along Tuel Lane and Tower Hill in Sowerby Bridge. Upgraded to an A-road with the same number.
B6140 (defunct)	A58 Rochdale Road, Halifax	A58 in Bolton Brow	Ran along Pye Nest Road; now upgraded to the A6142.
B6144	Haworth	Bradford	
B6145	Denholme Gate	Bradford	
B6148 (defunct)	Ring road around Bradford		Originally began at the A658 in Undercliffe and ran clockwise to the A641 in Wibsey, forming a northeast to south bypass. Extended to a full circle after WWII with two spurs marking the original ends: a short one along Killinghall Road to the A658 and a longer one from Chain Bar to Odsal Top, bypassing the original route to Wibsey. The entire original section, including the Odsal Top spur, became an extension of the A6036 in the 1960s, leaving the 1940s extension as the B6148. Around then the eastern section (between the A647 and B6145) was rerouted along Horton Grange Road and Ingleby Road. Soon after the entire B6148 was renumbered to A6177, and this took over the entire ring to form a full circle. The Odsal Top spur remains the A6036.
B6154	Leeds	Stanningley	
B6155	B6154 in Pudsey	B6157 in Stanningley	
B6156	Calverley	Stanningley	
B6157	Moor Allerton, Leeds	Stanningley	
B6158	B6057 at Jordanthrope	B6057 at Dronfield	Originally began south of Norton; this section is now part of the current B6057. Route was formerly the original B6057.
B6159	Headingley, Leeds	Halton, Leeds	Circumventing Leeds City Centre via Kirkstall, Headingley, Potternewton, and Harehills
B6160	Addingham	Aysgarth	
B6161	A61 at Killinghall	A658 near Pool in Wharfedale	
B6162	Harrogate	Beckwithshaw	
B6163	Knaresborough	A661 near Follifoot	
B6164	Knaresborough	Kirk Deighton	
B6165	Knaresborough	Pateley Bridge	
B6166	A46 south of Newark-on-Trent	A46/A1 north of Newark	A46 through Newark until bypassed. Originally ran from Knaresborough to Boroughbridge. Shortened slightly in the 1960s after the A1 Boroughbridge Bypass was built; the remainder was upgraded to Class I status as the A6055 around 1972. The entire original section north of Minskip is now unclassified after the A1 was upgraded to motorway status (this moved the A1(M)/A6055 junction further south).
B6167	A560 in Stockport	A57 at Debsdale	
B6168	A693, Annfield Plain	A692, Mountsett, near Flint Hill	Passes through Annfield Plain, Catchgate, Harelaw and Flint Hill Originally ran in Stockport, likely along Prince's Street linking the A6 to the A626. Renumbered to a portion of the B5423 in 1935. Now downgraded and mostly pedestrianized, although a small section still has Class II status.
B6169	A6017 in Audenshaw	B6170 in Dukinfield	
B6170	Ashton-under-Lyne	Hyde	
B6171	Heaviley, Stockport	Offerton, Stockport	Originally ran along Mossley Road in Ashton-under-Lyne. Now part of an extended B6194.
B6174	Mottram in Longdendale	Hattersley	
B6175	Greenfield	Dukinfield	
B6176	Stalybridge	Stalybridge	Caroline Street and Market Street
B6177	A635 at Mossley railway station	A670 in Top Mossley	Stamford Road
B6178	A6 at Levenshulme	A57 at Belle Vue	Original route from Miles Platting to Belle Vue renumbered A6010 in the 1960s; the extension to Levenshulme is all that remains.
B6179	Little Eaton	Watch Horn	Originally ran between Miles Platting and Cheetham Hill. Upgraded to Class I status as a portion of the A6010 in the 1960s.
B6180	A56 in Broughton, Salford	A665 in Cheetham Hill, Manchester	Waterloo Road
B6181	A62 Newton Street, Manchester	A6 Piccadilly, Manchester	
B6182	A6 in Salford	A6042 in Manchester	Greengate and New Bridge Street
B6183 (defunct)	B6184 (now A6041) Blackfriars Road, Salford	A6041 Chapel Street, Salford	Split in two by the A6042 and decommissioned; the section south of New Bridge Street is now part of the B6182 and the section just west of the A6042 is now gone, taken over by a car dealership.
B6184	A560 Wood Street, Stockport	A5102 Bramhall Way, Stockport	Created 2019; has a zone 6 number, despite existing west of the A6. One section former B5465.
B6185 (defunct)	A5066/B6184 Blackfriars Road, Salford	A56 Great Ducie Street, Salford	St Simon Street, now unclassified; much of route gone after the River Irwell was rerouted.
B6186	A56 Broughton, Salford	A6 in Salford	Frederick Road and Camp Street
B6187	A56 Broughton, Salford	A576 in Broughton, Salford	Knoll Street and Great Clowes Street
B6188 (defunct)	A62 Manchester Road in Hollinwood, Oldham	A627 Ashton Road in Hathershaw, Oldham	Upgraded to Class I status as a portion of the A6104 in the 1960s.
B6193 (defunct)	A62 Manchester Road, Oldham	A62 Yorkshire Street, Oldham	Section along Crossbank Street wiped out by the A62, section along Union Street West is now part of the A627 and the remainder unclassified.
B6196	South Turton	Bury	Ends at A58 Originally ran from Rochdale to Shaw. Renumbered as a northern extension of the B6194 in 1935; the eastern end is now unclassified due to rerouting of the A663.
B6197	Delph	Crompton	Grains Road and Buckstones Road
B6198	A56 Whitefield	A665 in Whitefield	Church Lane
B6199	A579 at Over Hulton	A575 at Farnworth	Plodder Lane

== B6200 to B6299 ==
Road	From	To	Notes
B6200	Attercliffe	Swallownest	Formerly A57 until the construction of new A57 link road onto the Sheffield Parkway. Originally ran along Hutton Lane in Bolton, connecting the A58 to the A579. Upgraded to Class I status as the A6145, probably due to construction of the M61.
B6201 (defunct)	A58 (now A676) Duane Road in Bolton	A579 Derby Street in Bolton	Declassified.
B6202	A673 in Bolton	A579 in Bolton	
B6203	B6202 in Bolton	A673 in Bolton	Spa Road
B6204	B6205 St George's Road in Bolton; A6172 Great Moor Street in Bolton	A676 in Bolton; A579 Trinity Road in Bolton	Exists in two sections; the section along Oxford Street is now pedestrianized.
B6205	A673 in Bolton	A676 in Bolton	Bow Street
B6206	A676 in Bolton	A666 in Bolton	Kay Street, Higher Bridge Street; originally ran along the full length of Kay Street (the A666 ran along Higher Bridge Street), but the two routes swapped places, so that the B6206 now runs along Higher Bridge Street and Kay Street is now the A666.
B6207	A666 in Bolton	A673 in Bolton	Waterloo Street
B6208	A676 in Bolton	A579 Bury Road in Bolton	
B6209	A673 Bury New Road in Bolton	A6053 in Little Lever	Originally continued to the A668 (now A665) in Radcliffe, but this was renumbered (along with all of the B6210) to the A6053 by 1926. The section west of Radcliffe is now part of the A665 when it replaced the A668.
B6210 (defunct)	A666 in Farnworth	B6209 in Little Lever	Became a western extension of the A6053 by 1926.
B6210 (defunct)	A639 Beastfair in Pontefract	A645 Southgate in Pontefract	Declassified. The section through the Market Place is now pedestrianized.
B6211 (defunct)	A58 in Breightmet	A6053 (former B6209) in Radcliffe	Became an extension of the A665.
B6212	B6213 in Bury	A58 in Bury	Fenton Street, Harvey Street, Newbold Street and Stephen Street
B6213	A676 near Hawkshaw	B6214 in Bury	Tottington Road, Bury Road, Market Street and Turton Road
B6214	A680 in Haslingden	B6213 in Bury	Helmshore Road, Lumb Carr Road, Longsight Road, Brandlesholme Road and Crostons Road
B6215	B6214 in Brandlesholme	A676 near Holcombe Brook	Brandlesholme Road and Holcombe Road
B6216	A58 Jubilee Way in Bury	A58 Bolton Street in Bury	Tenterden Street and Millett Street; originally began at the A56 Silver Street, but this section is now gone, lost under the inner ring road.
B6217 (defunct)	B6218 Market Street in Bury	A56 Manchester Road in Bury	Haymarket Street and Knowsley Street; paralleled the A56. Declassified due to road improvements in Bury.
B6218	B6219 Willington Road in Bury	A58 Angouleme Way in Bury	Market Street
B6219	A58 in Bury	B6222 in Bury	Wellington Road, Parkhills Road, Heywood Street, Bond Street and Parsonage Street
B6220 (defunct)	B6218 Market Street in Bury	A58 Rochdale Road in Bury	Much of route now gone: the western half is now under the market hall and the eastern half is now part of the A58.
B6225	Milnrow	Littleborough	Runs between the A640 in Milnrow and the A58 in Littleborough
B6230	Walton-le-Dale	Samlesbury	
B6231	Darwen	Church	
B6232	M65 junction 5	Haslingden	
B6233	Blackburn	Ramsgreave	
B6234	Knuzden	Oswaldtwistle	
B6235	B6232 near Haslingden	Helmshore	
B6236	Blackburn	Haslingden	Formerly A677. Originally ran along King Street in Accrington, between the A679 and A680. Due to road improvement, much of the route is now unclassified, although the eastern section is part of the A679.
B6237	Church	Accrington	
B6238	A681, Waterfoot	A671, Deerplay Moor	Passes through Whitewell Bottom, Lumb, Water, and joins the A671 for Burnley
B6241	A583 in Ashton on Ribble	A5085/A6063 in Deepdale	Preston Northern Ring Road Originally ran along Deepdale Road from Preston to Fulwood. Renumbered to a portion of the A6063 in the 1980s; the northern section is part of the current B6241.
B6242	A5085 at Preston	A6 at Preston	
B6243	A6063 in Preston	A671 in Clitheroe	Via Longridge
B6244	B5269 in Longridge	B6243 in Longridge	Preston Road
B6245	A666 in Wilpshire	B6243 near Longridge	Via Salesbury, Clayton-le-Dale (junction with A59), and Ribchester
B6246	Whalley	B6243 near Great Mitton	
B6247	Barrowford	Colne	
B6248	Brierfield	Fence	
B6249	Nelson	Wheatley Lane, Fence	
B6250	Colne	Trawden	
B6251	A59 near Horton	Foulridge	
B6252	Barnoldswick	A56 in Thornton in Craven	
B6253	A65 at Hellifield	A682 near Hellifield	
B6254	A65 at Kendal	A6 at Carnforth	B6601 (link to M6) terminates onto this road
B6255	Hawes	Ingleton	
B6258	Bamber Bridge	Walton-le-Dale	Formerly part of A6. Originally ran from Sedbergh to Kirkby Stephen. Renumbered as a northern extension of the A683 in the late 1950s.
B6259	Warcop	Garsdale	
B6260	M6 / A685 at Tebay	B6542 at Appleby-in-Westmorland	Passes through Tebay, Orton, Eden, Hoff and Burrells
B6261	A685, Gaisgill	A6, Shap Rural, Shap	Passes through Orton, Eden and Oddendale
B6262	A6, Eamont Bridge	A66, near Penrith	Passes through Brougham, Cumbria
B6263	M6, J42	A69, Warwick-on-Eden, Cumbria	Passes through Wetheral, Cumbria
B6264	A689	A7, Stanwix Bank	
B6265	A6131 (former A59) in Skipton	A59 in Green Hammerton	
B6265	A650 west of Shipley	A6068 in Cross Hills	Runs along the old A629 and A650. Duplicate number.
B6266	A58/A6060 in Rochdale	A58 in Rochdale	Former routing of the A58 through Rochdale. First used from Ripon to Masham. Upgraded to Class I status as a portion of the A6108 in the late 1920s. Next used in Rochdale, from The Esplanade to the A627 Blackwater Street. Swapped with the A58 when it was built north of Rochdale.
B6267	A61 near Skipton-on-Swale	A6108 in Low Burton	Originally continued to the A684 in Leyburn, but this was upgraded to Class I status early on and is now part of the A6108.
B6268	B6267 east of Low Burton	B6285 in Bedale	
B6269	B6144 in Heaton, Bradford	B6146 in Cottingley, Bradford	Originally ran from Leyburn to Downholme. Upgraded to Class I status as a portion of the A6108 in the late 1920s.
B6270	A6108 in Downholme	Nateby, Cumbria	Originally began in Scotch Corner and ended at Reeth. The section from Scotch Corner to Downholme was upgraded to a portion of the A6108 in the late 1920s and the extension to Nateby did not happen until 1935.
B6271	Richmond, North Yorkshire	Northallerton	
B6272	B6271 in Brompton-on-Swale	A6055 at Catterick Bridge	
B6273	A638 Wragby, West Yorkshire	A6195 south of Middlecliffe, South Yorkshire	Originally ran from Scorton to Plantation House. Put out of zone when the A1 was rerouted via Scotch Corner instead of Northallerton in 1924 (old route became an extension of the A167) and was renumbered to B1263 as a result.
B6274	Richmond, North Yorkshire	Staindrop	
B6275	A1(M)	A68	Roman Road
B6276	Middleton-in-Teesdale	Brough	
B6277	A66 near Greta Bridge	A689 in Alston	
B6278	Barnard Castle	Shotley Bridge	
B6279	Eggleston	Haughton le Skerne	
B6280	Blackwell	A66	
B6281	B6277 east of Mickleton	B6282 in Eggleston	
B6282	B6277 in Middleton-in-Teesdale	A6072 in Shildon	
B6283 (defunct)	A688 in Bishop Auckland	A6072 (now B6282) in Shildon	Much of route now part of the A6072, but the ends are now unclassified as Shildon and Tinsdale Crescent have been bypassed.
B6284	B6282 in Etherley Dene, Bishop Auckland	A689 at Newton Cap	
B6285	Bedale	A6055 near Burneston	Originally ran from Bishop Auckland to South Church. Renumbered as a northern extension of the A6072; the section north of the A688 Bishop Auckland bypass is now the A689 and the southern portion is now the B6282.
B6286	A690, Willington	A689, Toronto, County Durham	Passes through Sunnybrow and Hunwick
B6287	A688, Coundon	A167, Ferryhill	Passes through Coundon, Leeholme, Kirk Merrington
B6288	A167 Croxdale	B6287 Kirk Merrington	Passes through Tudhoe, Spennymoor
B6289 (defunct)	A6074 Grayson Road in Spennymoor	B6288 in Kirk Merrington	Declassified when the A688 Spennymoor bypass was built.
B6290	A693 Blind Lane, Chester le Street	A167 Park Road North, Chester le Street	Originally ran in Spennymoor from the B6288 Coulson Street to the A6074 Durham Road. Now part of the B6288 due to construction of the A688 Spennymoor bypass.
B6291	A688 Old Quarrington	A188 Cassop	Passes through Old Quarrington, Coxhoe and Quarrington Hill
B6292	B6196 in Starling	A665 in Radcliffe	Portion of route former A668. Originally ran from Brampton to Alston. Became an extension of the A689 in 1971; the section within the A69 Brampton bypass is unclassified.
B6293 (defunct)	B6277 in Alston	A68 in Black Hall	Upgraded (along with the then-B6292) to an extension of the A689 in 1971.
B6294	A686 near Clarghyll Hall	A689 in Nenthall	
B6295	Langley on Tyne	A689, Cowshill	Passes through Langley-on-Tyne, Catton, Northumberland, Thornley Gate, Sinderhope, Allenheads
B6296	A691, Lanchester	A689, Wolsingham	Passes through Hollinside Terrace, Satley, High Stoop, Wolsingham
B6297	B6296 east of Wolsingham	A68 in Tow Law	
B6298	A689 Crook, County Durham	B6299 Billy Hill	Passes through Crook, Billy Row and Billy Hill
B6299	A690, Willington, County Durham	A68, Tow Law	Passes through Willington, Billy Hill and Sunderland, Weardale

== B6300 to B6399 ==
Road	From	To	Notes
B6300	A690, Meadowfield	A167, Sunderland Bridge, County Durham	Passes through Meadowfield and Browney
B6301	Lanchester	A68, Tow Law	Passes through Cornsay Colliery, Hedley Hill
B6302	Cornsay Colliery	A690 Stonebridge, near Neville's Cross	Passes through Broompark, Ushaw Moor and Esh Winning
B6303	Allendale	Catton	
B6304	B6305 Branchend, Langley on Tyne	B6295 Beacon Rigg Farm, Langley on Tyne	
B6305	Hexham	A686, Langley on Tyne	Passes through Lowgate and Langley on Tyne
B6306	Hexham	Edmundbyers	Passes through Ruffside, Blanchland, Slaley, Northumberland, Fellside, Hexham
B6307	A695 Dilston	Linnels Bank	Passes through Dilston
B6308	Medomsley	A692 Delves Lane	Passes through Consett
B6309	Leadgate, County Durham	Belsay, Northumberland	Passes through Whittonstall and Ebchester
B6310	Burnopfield	A691, Blackhill near Consett	Passes through Hamsterley Mill and Medomsley
B6311	Clough Dene, near Tantobie	Flint Hill	Passes through Tantobie
B6312	Witton Gilbert	Plawsworth	
B6313	A693 Oxhill	A167 Chester-le-Street	Passes through South Moor, Craghead
B6314	Burnopfield	Rowlands Gill	
B6315	Ryton	Rowlands Gill	Passes through Woodside, Greenside, High Spen and Highfield
B6316	Whickham	A692, Sunniside, Gateshead	
B6317	A692, Lobley Hill	A695, near Crawcrook	Passes through Whickham, Swalwell, Blaydon-On-Tyne, Ryton, Barmoor and Crawcrook
B6318	Heddon-on-the-Wall	A7, south of Langholm	Includes the Military Road, which runs alongside Hadrian's Wall, some of which was demolished in the 18th century to provide material for the road. At 61.4 miles (98.8 km), it is the longest B Road in Mainland Britain.
B6319	A69 at Haydon Bridge	B6318 near Chollerford	Overlaps Cycle Route 72 (Northumberland)
B6320	A696 Otterburn	B6318 Humsaugh	19.8 miles long, passing through Otterburn, Bellingham, Park End, and Nunwick
B6321	A695 near Dilston	B6318	Passes through Corbridge and Aydon
B6322	Medomsley Road, Consett	A691 Durham Road, Consett	Not on the 1922 Road Lists, but was classified by 1932. Originally ran from west of Belsay to Whittle Dene. Renumbered as a portion of an extended B6309 by the end of the 1920s.
B6322	A69 west of Haltwhistle	A69 east of Haltwhistle	Original route of the A69 through Haltwhistle, designated in the 1990s. Duplicate number.
B6323	A69 north of Throckley	Ponteland	
B6324	B6323 at Callerton Lane End	A167 at Cowgate	
B6325	South Muskham	North Muskham	A1 until bypassed, then A6065 until A46 bypass around Newark
B6326	A46 north of Newark	A1 south of Newark	A1 until bypassed, then A6065 until A46 bypass.
B6327 (defunct)	A69 (now A186) West Road in Newcastle-upon-Tyne	A695 Scotswood Road in Newcastle-upon-Tyne	Put out of zone after the A1 was rerouted and was renumbered as a portion of the B1305.
B6328 (defunct)	A69 (now A186) Westgate Road, Newcastle-upon-Tyne	B6325 (now A191) Denton Road, Newcastle-upon-Tyne	Renumbered as a portion of the B1311 (some maps claim that the easternmost block is a disconnected portion of the B1600)
B6329 (defunct)	B6328 (now B1311) Elswick Road, Newcastle-upon-Tyne	A695 Scotswood Road, Newcastle-upon-Tyne	Declassified and partly pedestrianized.
B6330 (defunct)	A695 Scotswood Road, Newcastle-upon-Tyne	B6334 (now B1600) Forth Banks, Newcastle-upon-Tyne	Declassified; the section just south of Scotswood Road is now pedestrianized.
B6331 (defunct)	A69 (now A186) Westgate Road, Newcastle-upon-Tyne	A695 Scotswood Road, Newcastle-upon-Tyne	Declassified due to redevelopment; portions of the route are also gone.
B6332 (defunct)	A69 (now A186) Westgate Road, Newcastle-upon-Tyne	A6082 Redheugh Bridge Road, Newcastle-upon-Tyne	Later renumbered as a portion of the B1600, but now mostly unclassified. South of Westmorland Road is broken up by the college campus built on top and Railway Street is now part of the A695.
B6333 (defunct)	A6082 Railway Street, Newcastle-upon-Tyne	A695 Neville Street & A69 Westgate Road (both now A186), Newcastle-upon-Tyne	Much of route now unclassified; the western section is now part of the B1600 and Orchard Street is now just a queue for station taxis.
B6334 (defunct)	B6333 Forth Street, Newcastle-upon-Tyne	A184 at the northern end of the Swing Bridge, Newcastle-upon-Tyne	Now part of the B1600.
B6335 (defunct)	A695 (now A186) Neville Street, Newcastle-upon-Tyne	A1 Newgate Street, Newcastle-upon-Tyne	Section east of the A69 later declassified, Clayton Street West now part of the A695 and the remainder unclassified.
B6336 (defunct)	A69 (now A186) Westgate Road, Newcastle-upon-Tyne	A696 (now A189) Gallowgate, Newcastle-upon-Tyne	Rerouted along Corporation Street (original route now gone, lost under the now-demolished Tyne Brewery). Corporation Street is now part of the B1311 and the eastern end is now part of the A189. Except for the western end of Buckingham Street, the original B6336 is gone.
B6337 (defunct)	A696 (now A189) Barrack Road, Newcastle-upon-Tyne	A69 (now A186) Westgate Road, Newcastle-upon-Tyne	Declassified; the route has been split in two by the new A189. The southern end is now closed to traffic and the central section is now a shared space with the redevelopment of the Tyne Brewery site.
B6338 (defunct)	A1 (now B1318) near the Hancock Museum, Newcastle-upon-Tyne	B6339 Grandstand Road, Newcastle-upon-Tyne	Declassified when it was bypassed by the A167; the eastern end is now a spur of the B1318 and the western end merges into a slip road leading to the A189.
B6339 (defunct)	A696 (now A189) Ponteland Road, Fenham	A1 (now B1318) Great North Road, West Jesmond	Renumbered as a western extension of the A189.
B6340	B6398 in Newtown St Boswells	A68 north of Newtown St Boswells	Former routing of the A68 through Newtown St Boswells; the northern section is an old routing of the A6091. Originally ran from Kenton Bar to Gosforth; now part of an extended A191.
B6341	A696 at Otterburn	A1 near South Charlton	Passes through Northumberland National Park
B6342	Crossroads with A68 and A6079 near Colwell	B6341 at Rothbury	Over 20 miles long; goes through Little Bavington, crosses A696 near Kirkharle, then through Cambo and Ewesley
B6343	B6342 at Cambo	Morpeth	
B6344	Rothbury	A697	
B6345	Longframlington	Amble	
B6346	Alnwick	A697 near Wooperton	
B6347	B6346	Christon Bank	
B6348	A697 at Wooler	A1 near Bellshill	
B6349	B6348 near Wooler	A1 near Belford	
B6350	B6352 at Kelso	A698 at Cornhill-on-Tweed	
B6351	B6352 near Kilham	A697 at Akeld	
B6352	Kelso, Scottish Borders	Mindrum Mill, Northumberland	
B6353	A1 at Fenwick	A697 near Crookham	
B6354	A697 near Ford	A1167 at Tweedmouth	
B6355	A1107 at Eyemouth	B6371 at Tranent	41.3 miles (66.5 km), via Chirnside, Preston near Duns and Gifford
B6356	Earlston	B6404	
B6357	A68 near Jedburgh	Annan	Passes the A74(M) and B7076 (former A74 before bypass by motorway) near Kirkpatrick Fleming (north of Junction 21)
B6358	A68 at Jedburgh	A698 near Spittal-on-Rule	
B6359	A7, north of Hawick	East of Melrose, (A6091)	Meets at a cross roads on the A699
B6360	A7 north of Selkirk	A68 near Leaderfoot Viaduct	
B6361	Melrose	Newstead	
B6362	Stow	A697 near Lauder	
B6363	A198, at Longniddry	B6355 north of Pencaitland	4.7 miles (7.6 km), via Gladsmuir and Penston.
B6364	A6105 near Greenlaw	A6089 north of Kelso	
B6365	B6355	A6112 north of Duns	
B6366 (defunct)	B6365 north of Duns	A1 in Grantshouse	Upgraded to Class I status, becoming a portion of the A6112 in the late 1920s.
B6366 (defunct)	A6105 Langtongate, Duns	A6112 Castle Street, Duns	Now a portion of a rerouted A6105.
B6367	A7, north of Falahill	A6093 north of Pathhead	7.0 miles (11.3 km), via Crichton. Passes near Crichton Castle.
B6368	A6093 at Haddington	A7, south of Heriot	16.9 miles (27.2 km), via Humbie. Passes by Soutra Aisle near Gilston.
B6369	B6355 at Gifford	B6368 south of Haddington	4.0 miles (6.4 km)
B6370	B6355 East of Gifford	Thistly Cross Roundabout, A1 near Dunbar	
B6371	Humbie, East Lothian	Cockenzie and Port Seton, East Lothian	13.7 miles (22.0 km), via Ormiston and Tranent
B6372	A766 in Penicuik, Midlothian	A68 at Oxenfoord Castle, near Pathhead	14.4 miles (23.2 km), passing Temple, running through Gorebridge
B6373	A6106 in Dalkeith, Scotland	A6106 in Dalkeith	Wholly within Dalkeith, original route of A68
B6374	Galashiels	Melrose	Former routing of the A6091. Originally ran from Elginhaugh to Portobello and is the highest numbered road in Zone 6 in the 1922 Road Lists. Upgraded to the A6106 early on, probably by 1925. The northernmost section is now part of the A199 and the southernmost section is now unclassified.
B6374	Heage	Ripley	Duplicate number.
B6375	A625 at Whirlow	B6068	
B6376	Warmsworth	Maltby	
B6377	A671	A680 north of Rochdale town centre	
B6378	B6132	A638	
B6379	A641	A641	
B6380	A647	A6036 at Odsal	
B6381	A658 East of Bradford City Centre	A647	
B6382	Ilkley Town Centre	East of Ilkley	
B6383	Barnoldswick	Kelbrook	by way of Salterforth
B6384	Holme, Cumbria	Milnthorpe	
B6385	Crooklands	Milnthorpe	
B6386	Southwell	A614	
B6387	Ollerton	Gamston	
B6388	Lowfield, Sheffield	Mosborough, Sheffield	Newly defined in the 2010s, runs from A61/A621 junction near Sheffield city centre outwards to the south-eastern suburbs, consisting of (in order from the city centre) Myrtle Road, Prospect Road, Spencer Road, Richards Road, Gleadless Road, White Lane, High Lane and Quarry Hill. White Lane carries Sheffield Supertram tracks between Gleadless Townend and its junction with Fox Lane.
B6390	A635 at Fairfield	A6140 at Guide Bridge	
B6391	A666 road near Cadshaw	Bromley Cross, Bolton	
B6392	A6094 near Rosewell	A7, Gilmerton Road Roundabout	
B6393	A62 near Monsall	B6189 at Middleton Junction	
B6394	B6374	Melrose	Shortcut to Borders General Hospital
B6395	A695 West of Prudhoe	A695 East of Prudhoe	
B6396	B6352 south of Kelso	B6352 at Mindrum Mill	across the Anglo-Scottish border
B6397	A6089 near Kelso	A6105 near Earlston	
B6398	B6359	A68 at Newtown St Boswells	
B6399	A698	B6357 (north of Newcastleton)	Starts at the end of Hawick one-way system

== B6400 to B6499 ==
Road	From	To	Notes
B6400	A7 north of Ashkirk	A698 near Crailing	
B6401	A698 in Kalemouth	B6352 in Town Yetholm	
B6402	B6226 at Bob's Smithy Inn	A58 at Markland Hill	Originally continued to Fernhill Gate; this section is now unclassified.
B6403	Colsterworth	A17 at Byards Leap	Forms part of the Roman road Ermine Street
B6404	A68 in St Boswells	B6397 in Mainberry	
B6405	A698 in Denholm	B6359 near Hassendean	
B6406	A38 near Blackwell	B6397 near Hilcote	
B6407	Pleasley	Sookholme	
B6408	A619 in Bakewell	Bakewell railway station	Station Road, Bakewell
B6409	B6117 in Savile Town	A638 in Dewsbury	
B6410	A6021 in Broom	B6060 in Morthen	Also appeared along Talbot Road in Lancashire, but this is a typo for the B5410. Later maps showed the correct number.
B6411	A635 Hickleton, South Yorkshire	B6273 Great Houghton, South Yorkshire	
B6412	Lazonby	A66 near Temple Sowerby	
B6413	A6071 at Brampton	A6 at Plumpton	By way of Castle Carrock, Cumrew, Newbiggin, Croglin, High Bankhill, Kirkoswald and Lazonby
B6414	A6094 in Dalkeith	A199 in Tranent	
B6415	A199/A1140 in Portobello, Edinburgh	A6106 in Millerhill	One section former A1
B6416	A6 Welford Road, Leicester	A47 Uppingham Road, Leicester	Originally continued north and west to the A6; much of this became the A6030 in the 1960s and was then declassified (except for a short section) in the 2000s when the A6030 was rerouted to reach the A563.
B6417	A617 near Pleasley	A618 near Clowne	Formerly the southern portion of the A618. Originally followed Grosvenor Street in Ripley, only shown on a late 1930s map. Became a portion of the A610 by the 1950s, and is now part of the B6441/B6179 one-way system.
B6418	Long Duckmanton	Clowne	
B6419	Bolsover	Renishaw	
B6420	Babworth	A1/A57/A614	
B6421	A655 in Castleford	A628 in High Ackworth	
B6422	Scawsby	Hemsworth	
B6423 (defunct)	A60/A57 in Worksop	A57 in Worksop	The section along Newcastle Street is now part of the B6024 and the remainder unclassified.
B6424	A1081 in St Albans	B691 in St Albans	Alma Road
B6425	B6039 in Temple Normanton	A632 at Arkwright Town	Originally ran along Stockingstone Road on the north side of Luton, connecting the A6 to the A601. Upgraded to the A5228 between 1960 and 1975.
B6426	A1001/A1057 (The Comet Roundabout), Hatfield	A1000 Great North Road, Hatfield	Former portion of the A414. Originally ran from the A414 (now A1057) at St Albans to the A1 at Water End. The A1(M) split off the eastern end in the 1970s with the section between Colney Heath and Water End becoming the B197; the entire route is now the C174.
B6427	A634 in Maltby	B6376 in Braithwell	
B6428	A635 in Barugh Green, Bransley	B6421 in Featherstone	
B6429	Cullingworth	Bingley	Road in West Yorkshire that leaves at A629 at Cullingworth Moor before heading east through Cullingworth, Harden and then into Bingley town where it has a junction with the B6265. It crosses the River Aire immediately west of Bingley by the means of Ireland Bridge
B6430	A6 south of Catterall	A6 north of Garstang	
B6431	B6175 in Dukinfield	A635 in Stalybridge	Originally ran in Newcastle upon Tyne from Quayside to City Road. Became a portion of the B1600 in the 1980s.
B6434	Burnley	M65 J11	Originally ran in Kendal from Stramongate Bridge to Nether Bridge. Became a portion of an extended A65 in the 1950s.
~~B6439~~	unused		
B6440 (defunct)	A6086 Grainger Street, Newcastle-upon-Tyne	A696 New Bridge Street, Newcastle-upon-Tyne	Originally numbered B1306, it became the B6440 when the A1 was rerouted over the new Tyne Bridge, putting the route in Zone 6. Now unclassified due to redevelopment; the eastern end is now gone, lost under the A167(M).
B6441	Hartshay Hill (Ripley)	Greenwich (Ripley)	Originally ran from Codnor Gate to Greenhillocks. Now unclassified.
B6442 (defunct)	A426 Gallowtree Gate, Leicester	A6 Charles Street, Leicester	Out-of-zone on 1950s maps, so it must have been created before the A6 was moved east. Now unclassified.
B6443	A167 in Newton Aycliffe	A167 at Aycliffe Industrial Estate	
B6444	A167 in Aycliffe	A6072 in Heighington	Originally ran along Denby Dale Road in Wakefield, connecting the A636 to the A642. Declassified in the 1970s.
B6445	B6170 Crescent Road in Dukinfield	B6175 in Dukinfield	
B6446	A65 west of Kirkby Lonsdale	Main Street, Kirkby Lonsdale	Original routing of the A65. Originally ran along Reedyford Road in Nelson. Renumbered as an extension of the A6068.
B6447	Ewood	Beardwood	Part of the Blackburn Ring Road
B6448 (defunct)	B6099 Keresforth Hill Road in Kingstone	A628 Dodworth Road in Pogmoor	Upgraded to Class I status as a portion of the A6133 around the mid-1970s.
B6449	A629 at Four Lane End	A628 in Dodworth	Eastern end is former A628.
B6450 (defunct)	B6055	A625	Upgraded to Class I status as a portion of a rerouted A625 in 1999.
B6451	A659 in Otley	B6165 in Summerbridge	
B6455 (defunct)	A7 west of Newtongrange	A68 in Easthouses	Much of route became a portion of the B6482 in the 1970s.
B6456	A697 east of Whiteburn	A6105 in Choicelee	
B6457	A68 Fala Village	B6368	1.4 miles (2.3 km)
B6458	A68 near Fala Village	B6367 at Tynehead	2.3 miles (3.7 km)
B6459 (defunct)	A7 in Bridge Place	A6091 in Station Brae	Now a portion of a rerouted A7.
B6460	A697, near Greenlaw	B6461, near Paxton	
B6461	A6089 in Kelso	A1 Berwick Bypass	
B6461	A614 in Ollerton	A616 in New Ollerton	
B6462	A629 at Scout Dike	A629 in Thurgoland	Former routing of the A629 through Penistone.
B6463	A6182 Rossington	A57 Todwick	
B6464	Beeston	Chilwell	Bypasses by A6005
B6465	Ashford-in-the-Water	Wardlow	
~~B6466~~	unused		
B6467 (defunct)	A642 Marygate, Wakefield	A61 in Lower Warrengate, Wakefield	Declassified in the 1970s and now pedestrianized.
B6468	A627 in Hyde	A560 at Gee Cross	Former routing of the A627 before it was rerouted on top of the A6113.
B6469	A57 in Manchester	A635 in Manchester	Whitworth Street West, Whitworth Street and Fairfield Street
B6473	A56 Bury New Road, Whitefield	A665 in Whitefield	Former portion of the A668. Originally ran from High Cross to Oxton, acting as an eastern bypass of Lauder for A697 traffic. Renumbered as a spur of the A697 in the 1940s.
B6474	B6422 in South Elmsall	A1 in Wentbridge	Portion of route former A1.
B6475	A638 in Lupset, Wakefield	A636 in Thornes, Wakefield	Also ran along Park Road in Oldham in the 1970s. Now unclassified.
B6476 (reserved)			Listed in the DfT Road List as "Reserved for Wakefield Outer Ring Road".
B6477	A62/A627 (Manchester Street Roundabout) in Oldham	A62/A669 in Oldham	Former portion of the A62. One section along High Street is now pedestrianized and the remainder gone, with the Magistrates' Court and Town Square Shopping Center built on top.
B6478	Clitheroe	Long Preston	
B6479	Ribblehead	Settle	
B6480	A683 near Farleton, Lancashire	A65 near Clapham, North Yorkshire	
B6481	A639 in Stourton	A639/M1 in Rothwell Haigh	Formerly the A639 before it was bypassed by the M1.
B6481	A427 Oakley Road, Corby	A6086 in Corby	Much of original route now the A6014.
B6482	A7 at Newtongrange	A6106 in Dalkeith	Was the B6455 before the 1970s.
~~B6483~~ - ~~B6499~~	unused		

== B6500 to B6999 ==
Road	From	To	Notes
~~B6500~~ - ~~B6520~~	unused		
B6521	Eyam	A6187 near the Fox House Inn	
~~B6522~~	unused		
B6523 (defunct)			Listed in the DfT Road lists as running from Old Felton to West Moor via Felton. This was the former routing of the A1 through Felton, but no evidence has been found that the road had the B6523 number. The number was actually used for the short section connecting the two sections of the B6345, and the remainder declassified.
B6524	A197 Loansdean, Morpeth	A696 Belsay	Passes through Loansdean, West Edington, Whalton
B6525	A1 Scremerston	A697 Wooler	Passes through Ancroft, Barmoor Castle (near Lowick), Doddington, Wooler
B6526 (defunct)	Rawtenshall	Edenfield	Former routing of the A56; now unclassified.
B6527	A56 and A680, Bent Gate, Haslingden	A680, Edenfield	Formerly A680. Passes through Ewood Bridge
B6528	A69, Horsley, Northumberland	A69, Denton	Passes through Heddon-on-the-Wall, Throckley, Walbottle, Blucher
B6529	A68 Corbridge	B6321 Corbridge	
B6530	B6321 Corbridge	A69 near Corbridge	Passes through Corbridge – Newcastle Rd.
B6531	B6305 Battle Hill, Hexham	A69 Burnland Terrace	Passes through Hexham
B6532	A691, Framwellgate Moor	A693, Stanley	Passes through Sacriston, Edmondsley, Craghead, The Middles, Stanley, County Durham
B6533	Sheffield Parkway/A630	Catcliffe	
B6534 (defunct)	A696 Ponteland Road, Newcastle upon Tyne	B6326 (now B1305) Two Ball Lonnen, Newcastle upon Tyne	Fenham Hill Drive; likely short-lived (or never existed) as it never appeared on any known maps. Now unclassified.
B6535	Rishton	Great Harwood	Formerly the A6064
B6536	A597 in Bolton	A575 in Bolton	Former portion of the A666.
B6537 (defunct)	A59 at Inghey Bridge	A65 in Skibeden	Main east-west road through Skipton, designated when the northern bypass was built. Was the A59 to the west and A65 to the east; likely short-lived (or never existed) and is now part of the A6069.
B6538 (defunct)	A65/A59/A629 in Stirton	A59 in Haw Park	East-west route through Skipton, designated after the northern bypass was built. Was the A65 to west of Skipton and the A59 to the east. It is unknown if the route was signed on the ground (if it was signed, it was short-lived). The former A59 section is now the A6131 and the former A65 section is unclassified.
B6539	Moor Hill roundabout, A61, Sheffield	Corporation Street, A61, Sheffield	Formerly the A57.
B6540	A50, Castle Donington	Long Eaton, The Green	
B6541	A66/A1130 in Thornaby-on-Tees	B1272 in Middlesbrough	Former routing of the A67 (and A176 before that).
B6542	Appleby-in-Westmorland	A66	
B6543	A617/A619/A632 in Chesterfield	A619 in Tapton	Former routing of the A619. Some maps claim that the southern end is at a roundabout with the A617/A619/A632 while other claim the southern end is at the B6057.
B6544 (defunct)	A6144 in Ashton upon Mersey	M63 J8 (now M60 J6) at Sale Golf Club	Number allocated for the portion of the A6144 bypassed by the A6144(M) (now A6144). The road remained Class I, so the B6544 number was never used.
B6545	B6323 in Darras Hall	A696 near Newcastle Airport	
B6546	Chapeltown, Sheffield (A629/A6135)	Grenoside, Sheffield (A61)	Designated 2008 to replace the A629 through Burncross. Was numbered incorrectly as the B113 on maps, but this has since been fixed.
B6547	A57 Fulwood Road	B6069 Clarkhouse Road	Runs along Glossop Road
~~B6548~~ - ~~B6599~~	unused		
B6601	M6 J35 (Carnforth Interchange)	B6254 near Carnforth	Formerly part of the A601(M) until 2020. (Some maps still show this as A601(M).) Initially thought to have been a spur of the B6254, signs posted in 2021 show the B6601 number. The B6601 is the first B-road to have motorway restrictions and also have been an ex-motorway.
B6670 (defunct)	A607	A46	For a short period in the 1980s/early 1990s, the B6670 was the route of the former A46 through Syston; this has now been declassified, except for the northern end which is part of the A46/A607 grade-separated junction.
B6902	M1 J46 (Austhorpe Interchange)	A6120 Shadwell	Part of the former Leeds Outer Ring Road in the Cross Gates/Seacroft area.
B6918	A1 J77 at Kenton Bar	A696 at Newcastle Airport	Follows the original line of the A696 between the A1 Junction 77 and Newcastle International Airport.
