= Ninebanks =

Village in Northumberland, England

Coordinates: 54.8757°N 2.3365°W

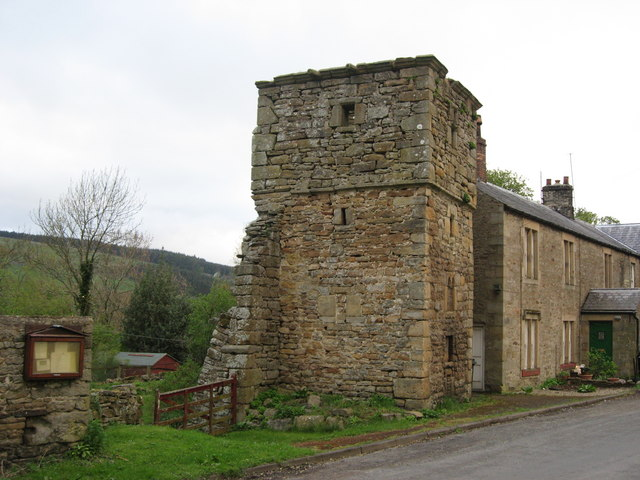
- Ninebanks Tower

- Location within Northumberland
- OS grid reference: NY785535
- Civil parish: West Allen
- Unitary authority: Northumberland
- Ceremonial county: Northumberland
- Region: North East
- Country: England
- Sovereign state: United Kingdom
- Post town: Hexham
- Postcode district: NE47
- Police: Northumbria
- Fire: Northumberland
- Ambulance: North East
- UK Parliament: Hexham

Ninebanks is a small village in south west Northumberland, England in the North Pennines Area of Outstanding Natural Beauty 8 miles (13 km) north-east of Alston by road. It is noted for the early sixteenth-century Ninebanks Tower, sometimes described as a pele tower, but possibly built as a watchtower. It is made of sandstone and has four floors, the lowest of which is now below the level of the road. There is an independently run Ninebanks Youth Hostel, which is actually in nearby Mohope.

== Religious sites ==
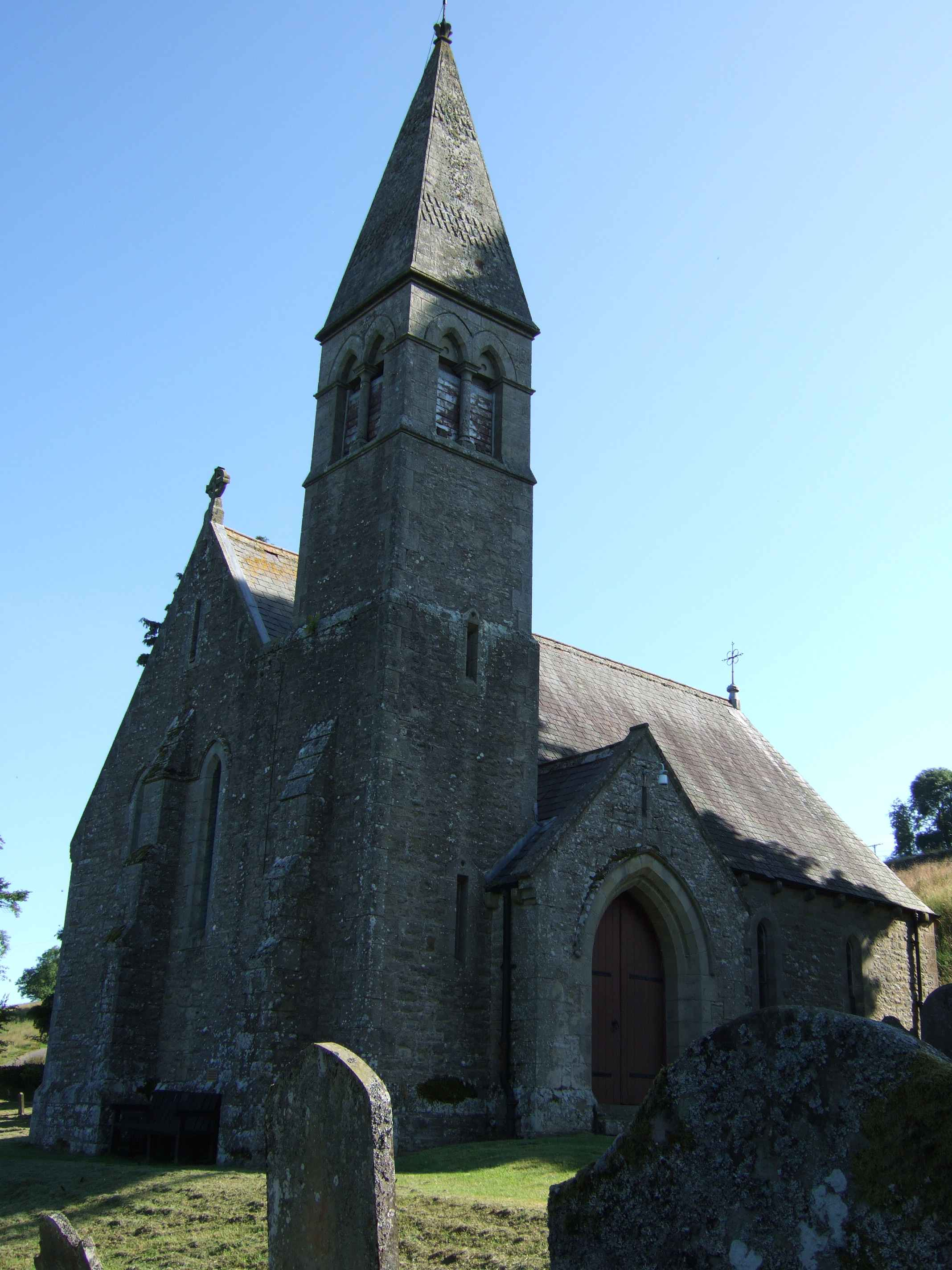
Ninebanks St Mark's Church.

The first St. Mark's Church on the present site in Ninebanks was consecrated in 1764. The church was rebuilt in 1871. Windows were given by Mr. R. Lee in 1880.

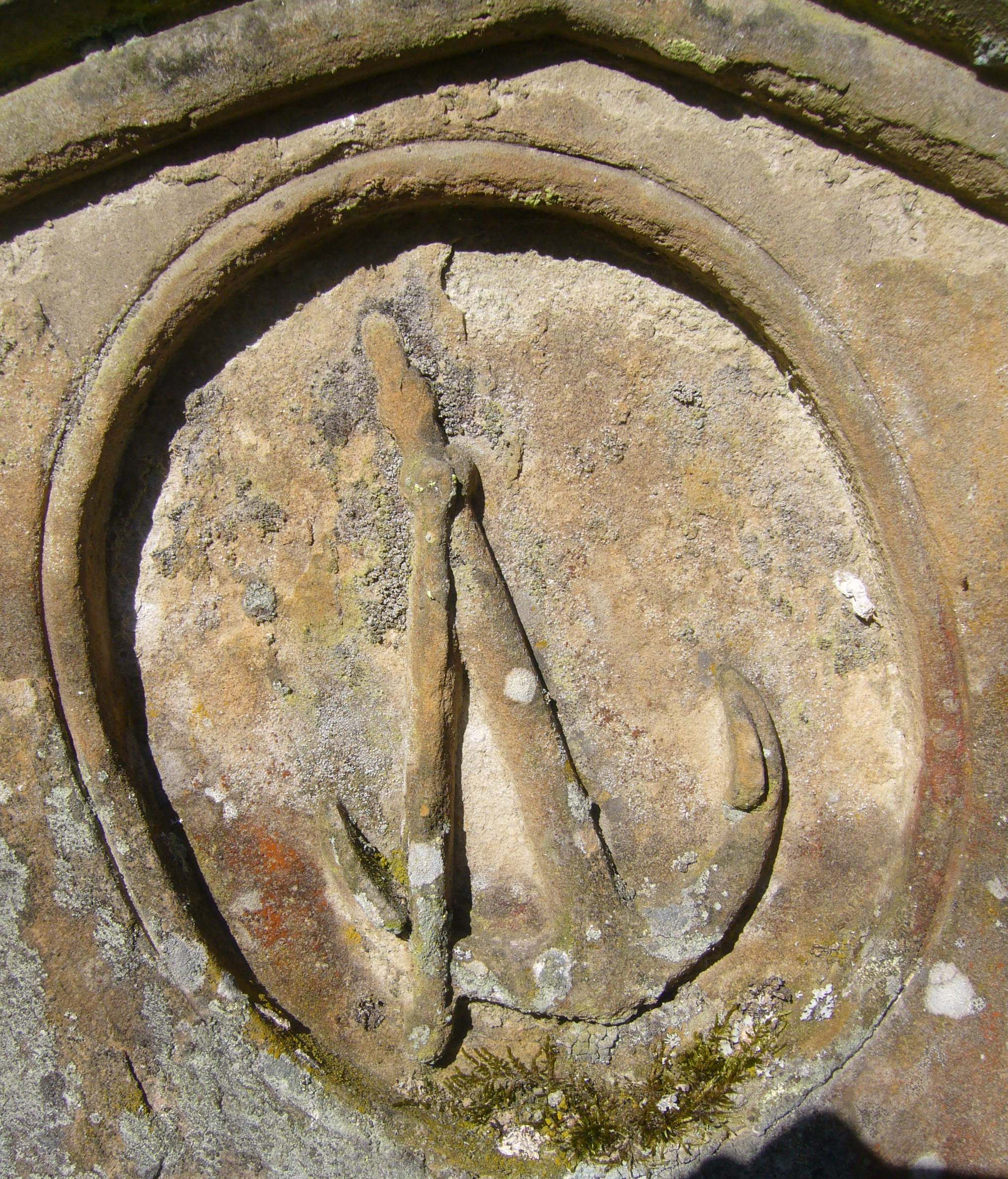
St Mark's churchyard, Ninebanks: Detail from gravestone.

== Notable people ==
Isaac Holden was born at Redheugh, Mohope around 1804 and baptised nearby at St. Mark's Church, Ninebanks, in 1805. He was a local philanthropist and a Methodist. His working life began in the lead mines of Mohope and the West Allen, later on, he became an itinerant tea seller around the North Pennines. It was a livelihood he combined with community fundraising by selling poems, tracts, and even his own portrait. Evidence of his contribution to community life can be seen in the old hearse house at Ninebanks. This was built to keep the "Holden hearse", which he presented to the people of the West Allen Valley in 1856. It was his final act of generosity, as he died the following year. The stone-built hearse house can still be seen past St. Mark's Church and the old school at Ninebanks and on the same side of the road to Carrshield. There is also a commemorative memorial to Isaac Holden in St. Cuthbert's churchyard in Allendale. The 36-mile (58 km) Isaac's Tea Trail is a circular walk named after him—Isaac's Tea Trail. This passes near the hamlet of Ninebanks.
