= Hamsterley =

Hamsterley may refer to:

- Hamsterley, Bishop Auckland, a village in County Durham, England
- Hamsterley, Consett, a village in County Durham, England
- Hamsterley Forest, near Bishop Auckland
- Hamsterley Hall, a country house near Consett
- Hamsterley Mill, a village near Consett
- Ralph Hamsterley (died 1518), Master of University College, Oxford
