= Museum of Classic Sci-Fi =

Museum in Allendale, England

Coordinates: 54°53′48.8″N 2°15′21.3″W

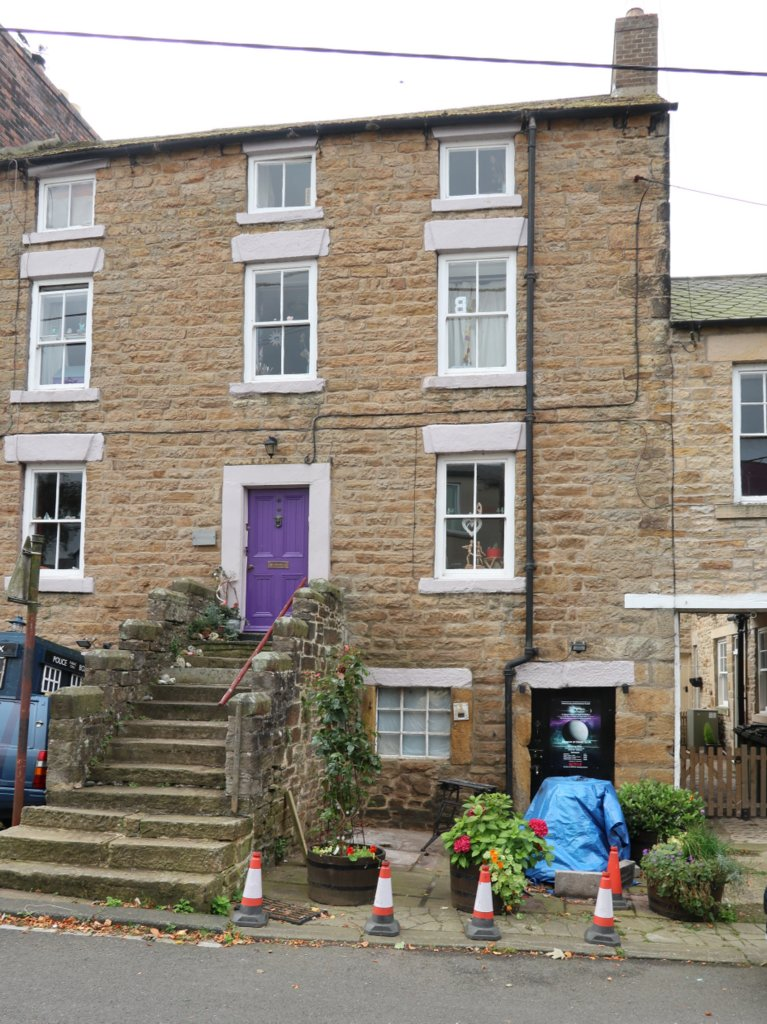
Museum entrance (at lower right)

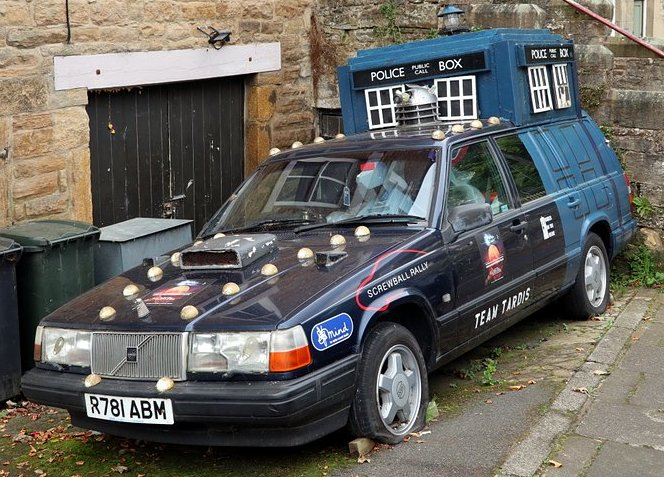
The Volvardis

The Museum of Classic Sci-Fi is in Allendale, Northumberland in England. The museum opened in 2018 and houses a collection of more than 200 props, costumes and artworks from a number of "classic", mid to late-20th century science fiction franchises. The Guardian has described the establishment as "one of Britain’s most eccentric small museums".

== History ==
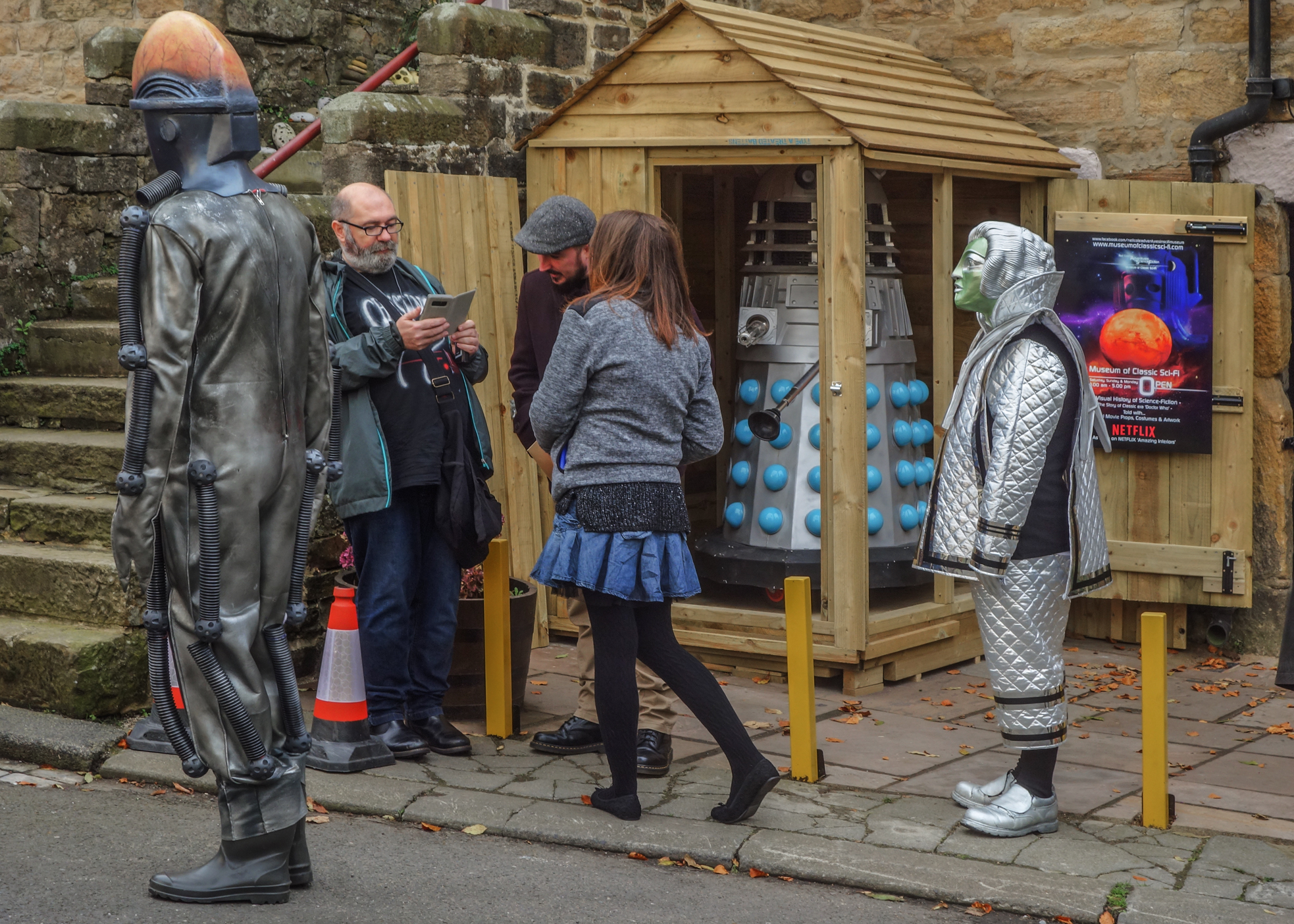
The disputed Dalek shed and some visitors

The museum was founded by art teacher Neil Cole and opened in October 2018. It is situated in the cellar of Cole's four-storey Georgian townhouse in Allendale, Northumberland, which has a grade II listing.

Cole dreamt of establishing a science fiction museum as a child, being inspired by seeing a Tardis prop from Doctor Who on the Blackpool seafront at the age of five. Cole watched a lot of science fiction as a child, particularly Jon Pertwee and Tom Baker as Doctor Who; he also read Marvel Comics. Cole acquired props from a number of science fiction programmes over the years. His first costume was that of the character Ohica from Doctor Who's 1976 serial The Brain of Morbius. He acquired that costume when he was a student and he had to sell his motorcycle to fund the purchase.

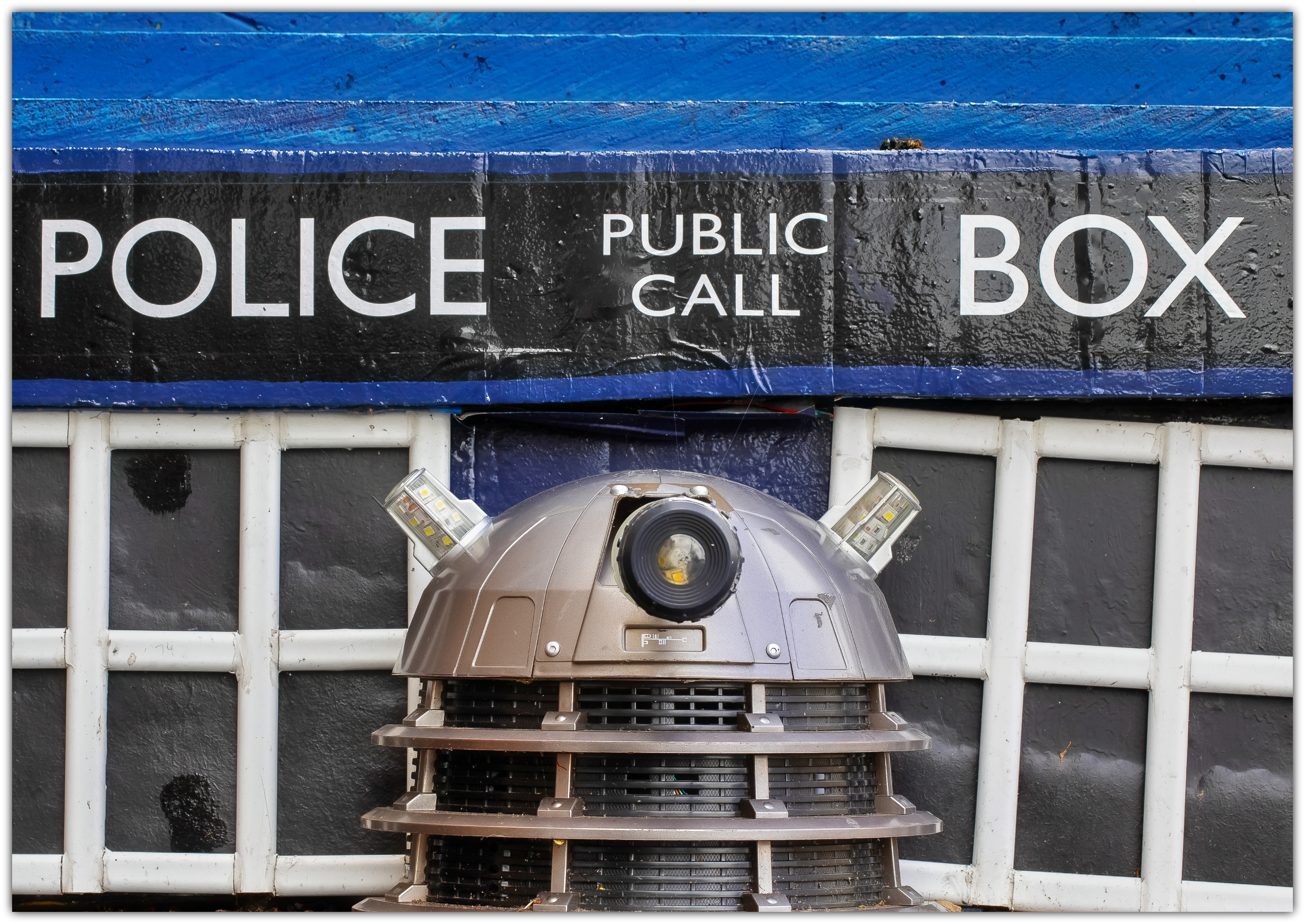
Dr Who exhibits

After moving into the neglected house it took Cole five years to convert the cellar into the museum. He has since acquired other props, including the head of a robot mummy from the 1975 Doctor Who serial Pyramids of Mars, which was donated by the family of a milkman who had been given it by the BBC in the late 1970s, instead of throwing it away. The museum also holds the costume of Rasiinian ambassador Runepp. It was designed for a competition and as a treat it was worn by a fan in The Muse, a 1996 episode of Star Trek: Deep Space Nine. As of 2021 the museum held more than 200 costumes, props and artwork from Doctor Who, Blake's 7, Star Trek, Flash Gordon, Thunderbirds and the Marvel universe. The museum also operates a Volvo car with a Tardis on the roof, which is named the "Volvardis".

In 2019 the museum was involved in a planning dispute with Northumberland County Council. Cole had, with an after-school arts class, created a replica of a Doctor Who Dalek for display outside the museum. The Dalek was protected by a wooden shed structure. The council's opinion was that the shed required planning permission which they considered was unlikely to be granted as they thought the shed was out of character with Cole's house. Cole was asked to remove the shed. Cole considered that removing the shed, and the Dalek, would adversely affect attendance at the museum and threaten its future. The Northumberland County Council planning opinion was opposed by dozens of people from the village and across the world, with local residents erecting their own Daleks in protest. After receiving press coverage from across the world the council withdrew its objection to the shed.

The museum was forced to close during the nationwide COVID-19 lockdowns. This gave Cole time to restructure the exhibits and carry out works to create more exhibition space. The museum reopened in late 2021 with a grand reopening weekend attended by Doctor Who actress Sophie Aldred and fans wearing science fiction costumes. Cole was unable to attend the event due to suffering from fatigue following a COVID-19 infection. The event was filmed by Reeltime Pictures for a documentary about the museum, which had earlier featured in another of their productions Lockdown, documenting the lives of Doctor Who fans during the pandemic.
