= Harley, South Yorkshire =

Hamlet in South Yorkshire, England

Coordinates: 53.479°N 1.446°W

Harley
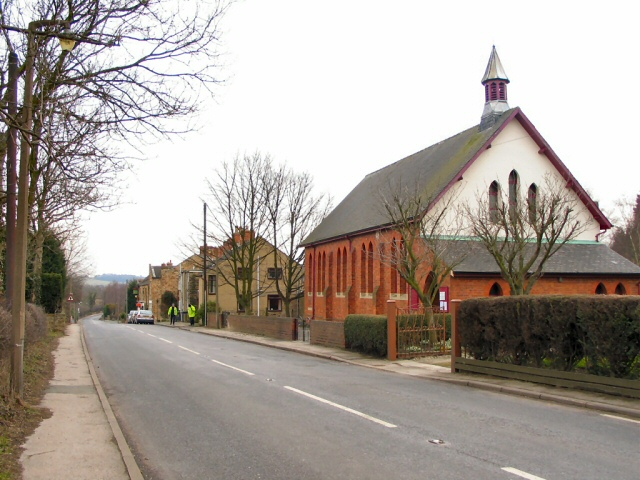
- Harley Mission Church on the B6090

- Location within South Yorkshire
- Civil parish: Wentworth
- Metropolitan borough: Rotherham
- Metropolitan county: South Yorkshire
- Region: Yorkshire and the Humber
- Country: England
- Sovereign state: United Kingdom
- Post town: Rotherham
- Postcode district: S62
- Dialling code: 01226
- Police: South Yorkshire
- Fire: South Yorkshire
- Ambulance: Yorkshire
- UK Parliament: Wentworth and Dearne

Harley is a hamlet in the civil parish of Wentworth, in the Rotherham district lying to the north of Rotherham and Sheffield, South Yorkshire, England.
