= West Allen =

Civil parish in Northumberland, England

Coordinates: 54.847°N 2.328°W

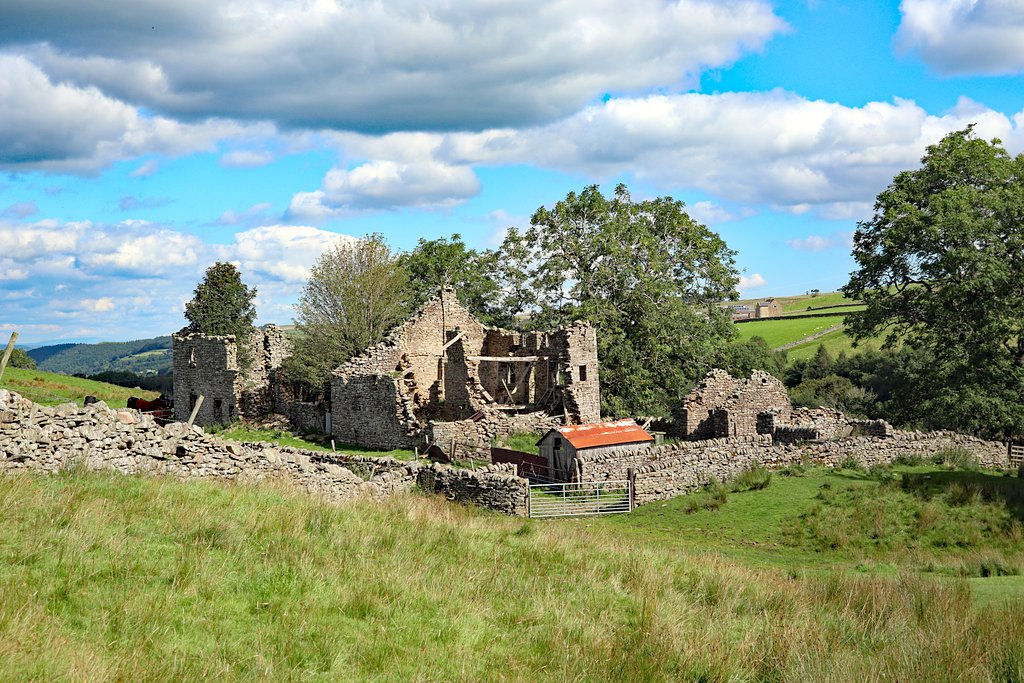
- Ruined buildings at Appletree Shield

- Location within Northumberland
- Population: 280 (Parish, 2021)
- Civil parish: West Allen
- Unitary authority: Northumberland
- Ceremonial county: Northumberland
- Region: North East
- Country: England
- Sovereign state: United Kingdom
- Post town: HEXHAM
- Postcode district: NE47
- UK Parliament: Hexham

West Allen is a civil parish in Northumberland, England. The parish covers the valley of the River West Allen. The main settlements in the parish are Carrshield and Ninebanks. At the 2021 census, the parish had a population of 280.

== History ==
The parish of West Allen was created in 1897 from part of the parish of Allendale, which had historically been a chapelry within the ancient parish of Hexham.

Prior to the 1897 split, the parish of Allendale had covered the two neighbouring valleys of Allendale itself along the East Allen river and West Allendale along the West Allen river. The parish was subdivided into a number of townships and also had an extensive area of common land known as Allendale Common. In 1897, the townships in West Allendale were constituted a separate civil parish called West Allen. Allendale Common was deemed to be common to both the reduced parish of Allendale and the new parish of West Allen, making for very complicated parish boundaries. The boundaries between Allendale and West Allen were eventually simplified in 1987, when Allendale Common was split between the two parishes.

== Governance ==
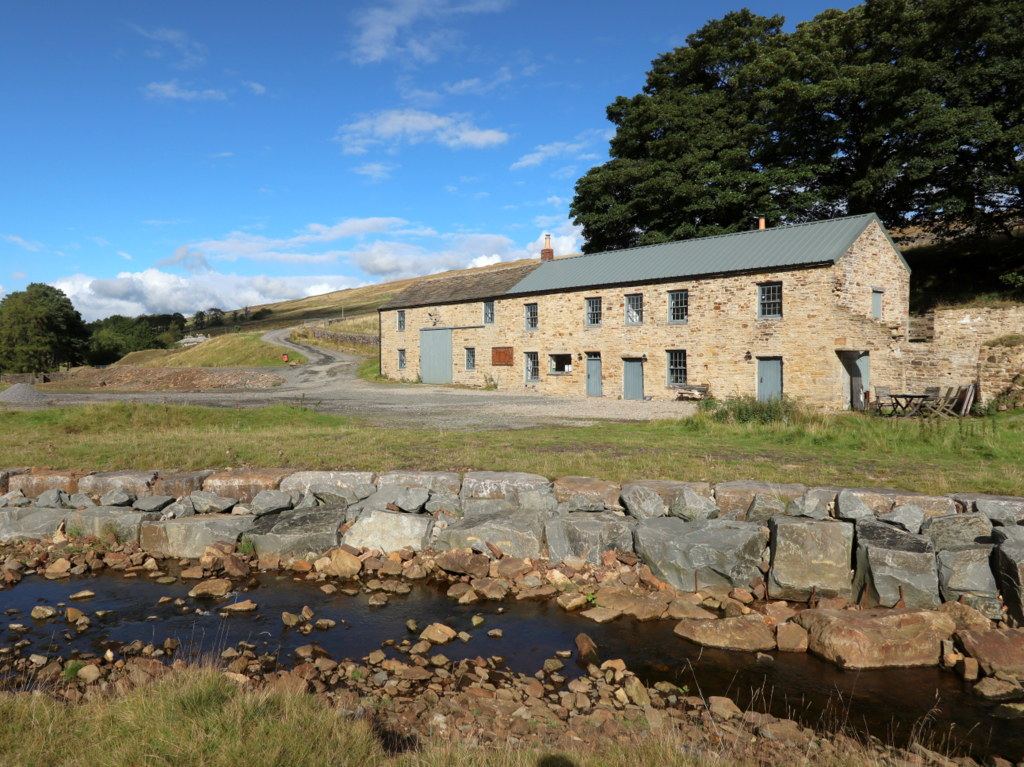
Carrshield Village Hall at the converted Barney Craig Mine Shop

There are two tiers of local government covering West Allen, at parish and unitary authority level: Allendale Parish Council and Northumberland County Council. The parish council generally meets alternately at Ninebanks Church and Community Hall and at Carrshield Village Hall, the latter being in the converted Barney Craig Mine Shop.

For national elections, West Allen forms part of the Hexham constituency.

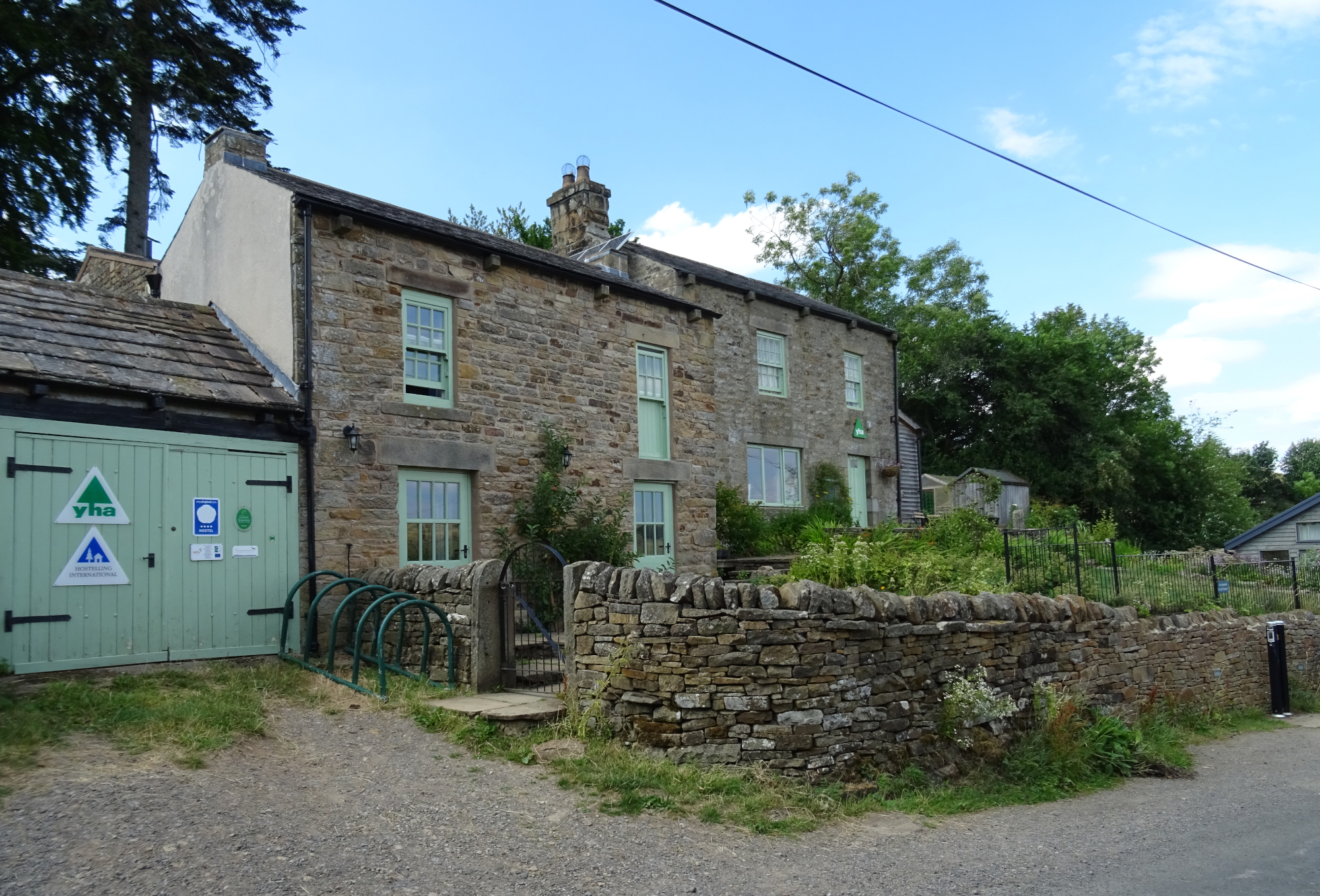
Ninebanks Youth Hostel
