= Allendale Co-operative Society =

Consumer co-operative in Allendale, Northumberland, England

Coordinates: 54.8975°N 2.2542°W

Allendale Co-operative Society Limited
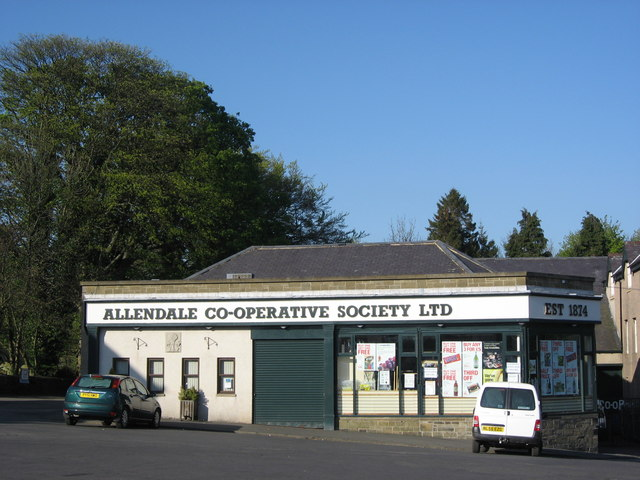
- Company type: Independent retail co-operative
- Founded: 24 December 1874; 151 years ago
- Headquarters: Allendale, Northumberland, England
- Revenue: £1.9m (2021)
- Total assets: £2.1m (2021)
- Members: 1950 (2021)
- Number of employees: 26 (2021)
- Website: allendalecoop.co.uk

Allendale Co-operative Society is a small consumer co-operative in the village of Allendale, Northumberland, England. Founded in 1874 as the Allendale Industrial and Provident Society, the co-operative is one of the few remaining British co-operative retail societies still operating from a single village store.

The co-operative is incorporated as a registered society, and as a consumer co-operative the society is owned and democratically controlled by its members who are its customers. Alongside general meetings the members elect a board of directors to oversee the management of the society.

In 2021 the co-operative had 1950 members, a turnover of £1.9m, assets of £2.1m and 26 employees. In addition to the store the co-operative also operates a delivery service for the surrounding rural area, as well as leasing out another shop in the village to a butchers and some residential property.

As an independent society the co-operative is able to take advantage of the purchasing power of the national retail co-operative wholesaler, Federal Retail and Trading Services, while also sourcing products from local and alternative suppliers.

== See also ==
- British co-operative movement
