= Sunnybrow =

Village in County Durham, England

Coordinates: 54°42′14″N 1°42′2″W

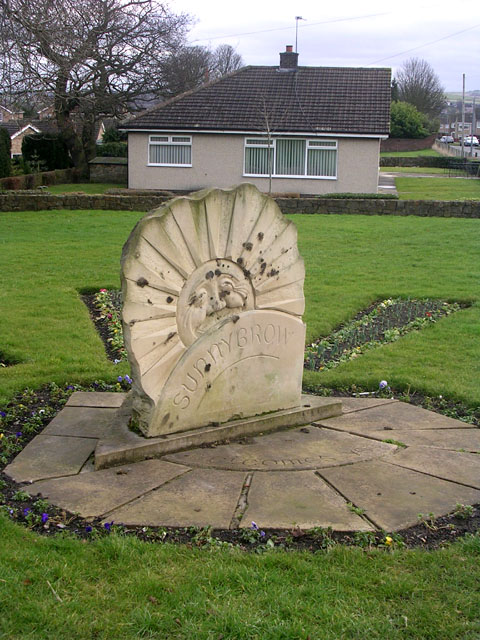
Village sign, February 2006

Sunnybrow is a village in County Durham, in England. In the 2001 census Sunnybrow had a population of 1,296. It is effectively the southern suburb of Willington.

It has a primary school and a car show room as well as a cemetery which was created in 1889 along with a now demolished church as part of the Sunnybrow St. John Parish. In 2008, its only post office was closed. Sunnybrow is also home to the Spectrum Leisure Complex (opened in 1985 by Lord Roxborough who was eight at the time) which featured the only dry ski slope in the area. However, due to a decline in the demand for alpine skiing in the South West Durham area, this part of the facility was closed in 2004.
