= Carrshield =

Coordinates: 54.8231°N 2.3100°W

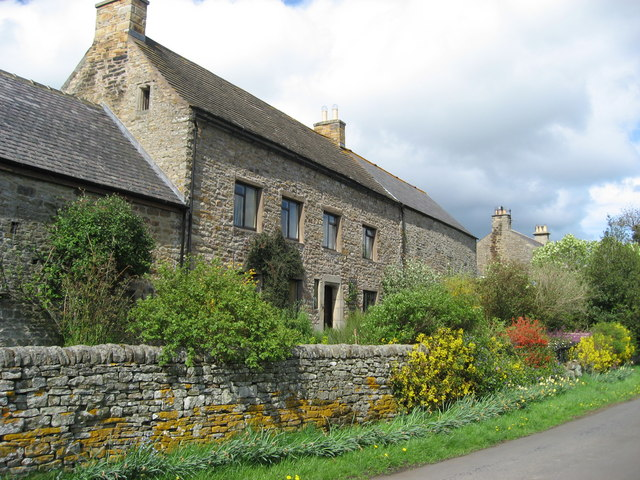
- Farm buildings at Low Broadwood Hall

- Location within Northumberland
- OS grid reference: NY801476
- Civil parish: West Allen
- Unitary authority: Northumberland
- Ceremonial county: Northumberland
- Region: North East
- Country: England
- Sovereign state: United Kingdom
- Post town: HEXHAM
- Postcode district: NE47
- Police: Northumbria
- Fire: Northumberland
- Ambulance: North East
- UK Parliament: Hexham

Carrshield is a village in West Allen parish, Northumberland, England. It lies in the Pennines between Penrith and Hexham.

It is a small village with an old school building in the centre of the village. The school was built in 1851 and is now three houses. Carrshield is surrounded by fell ground and is littered with old disused mines. Remnants of the old stone works where the lead was mined can still be seen next to the river. There are no shops in Carrshield.

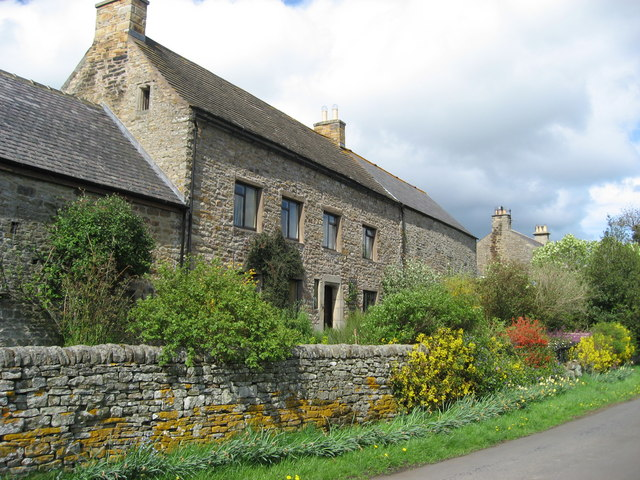
Farm buildings at Low Broadwood Hall

Carrshield has numerous farms surrounding it, including a Stud and Rehabilitation Centre for horses. It also has a Methodist Chapel.

The village name is often misspelt on older maps as 'Carr Shield' but is now correct on OS maps.
