= Allenheads =

Village in Northumberland, England

Coordinates: 54.804°N 2.227°W

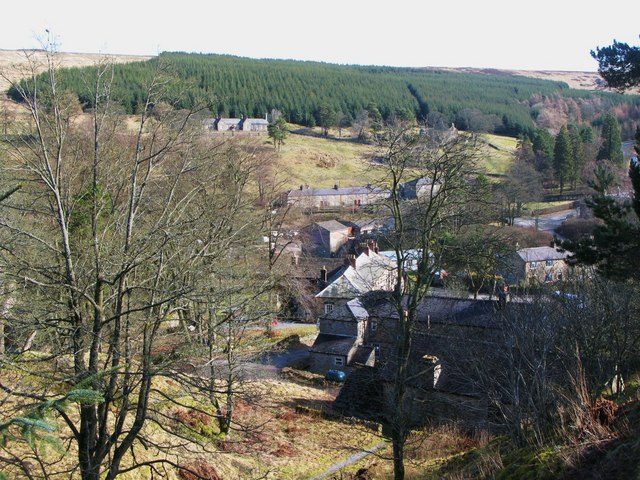
- Allenheads

- Location within Northumberland
- OS grid reference: NY855455
- Unitary authority: Northumberland
- Ceremonial county: Northumberland
- Region: North East
- Country: England
- Sovereign state: United Kingdom
- Post town: HEXHAM
- Postcode district: NE47
- Dialling code: 01434
- Police: Northumbria
- Fire: Northumberland
- Ambulance: North East
- UK Parliament: Hexham

Allenheads is a former mining village in the Pennines to the north of Weardale in Northumberland, England. Lead extraction was the settlement's industry until the mine closed in the late 19th century. Allenheads, which is 404 m (1,325 ft) above sea level, is situated 8 miles (13 km) further along the River East Allen from Allendale.

== History ==
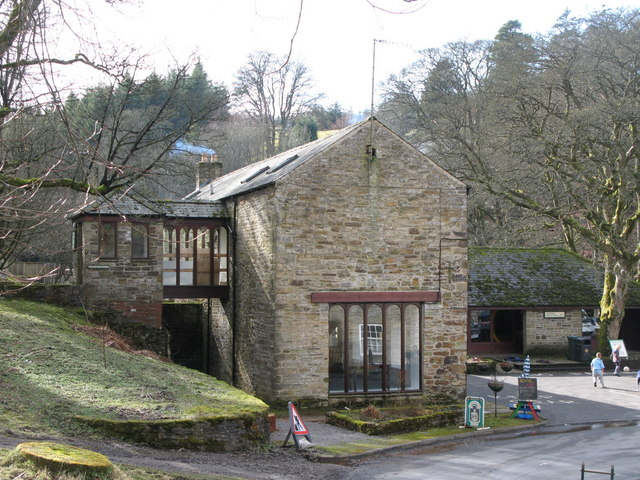
Allenheads Heritage Centre

The settlement was founded around lead mining. The first mine to open in the area was in the 1880s. It soon became a leading lead mines in the Northern Dales. However, within two decades of opening, it was closed in 1896 devastating the local community.

In 1970s, the mine was briefly reopened by British Steel Corporation as the Beaumont Mine in the 1970s to extract Fluorspar. However, the venture was not a success as it proved cheaper to source the Fluorite elsewhere.

The local economy is now dependent on agriculture and tourism. The village currently has a café, a contemporary Arts centre, and inn. An industrial heritage centre chronicling the local mining industry has a preserved Armstrong Whitworth hydraulic engine which was located in the mine's sawmill. It is now located in a purpose made exhibition hall in the village centre. Several hydraulic engines – built by the engineering firm started by William Armstrong, 1st Baron Armstrong of Elswick, Tyne and Wear- were installed at the mine. Drawings of these other machines have been conserved.

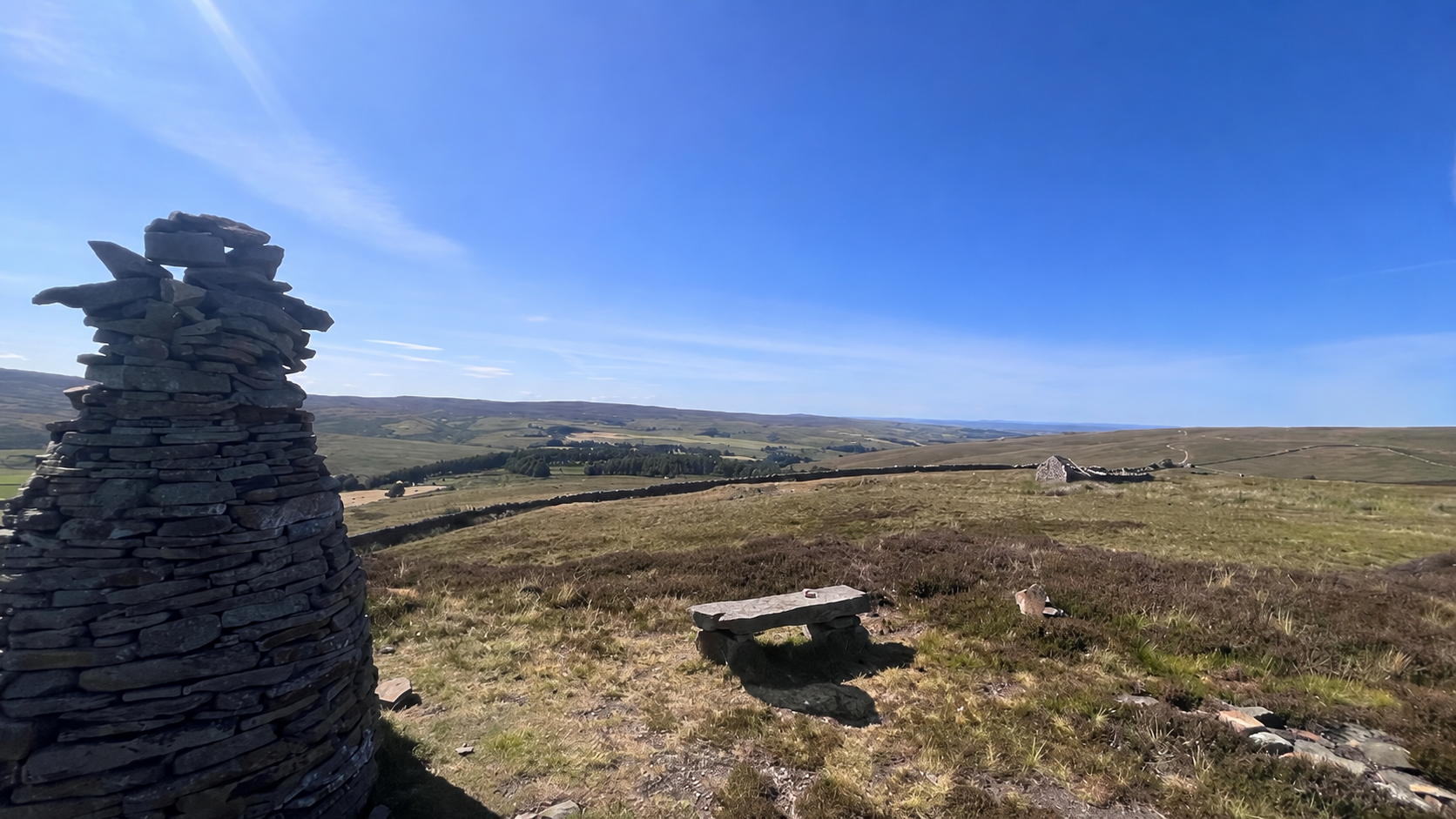
The view from Keith Walker’s Cairn

In October 2017 a stone cairn was restored overlooking Allenheads and provides magnificent views to signify the time in office of Keith Walker, who was chair of the Allenheads Trust for nearly 15 years. The plaque on the cairn reads; “Cairn restored in 2017 to gratefully mark the time in office of Keith Walker Chair of The Allenheads Trust 2003 - 2017”. The cairn is on the moor to the east of Allenheads and can be accessed via a track just off the road eastwards to Rookhope. Amenities such as a memorial bench and small car park are present.

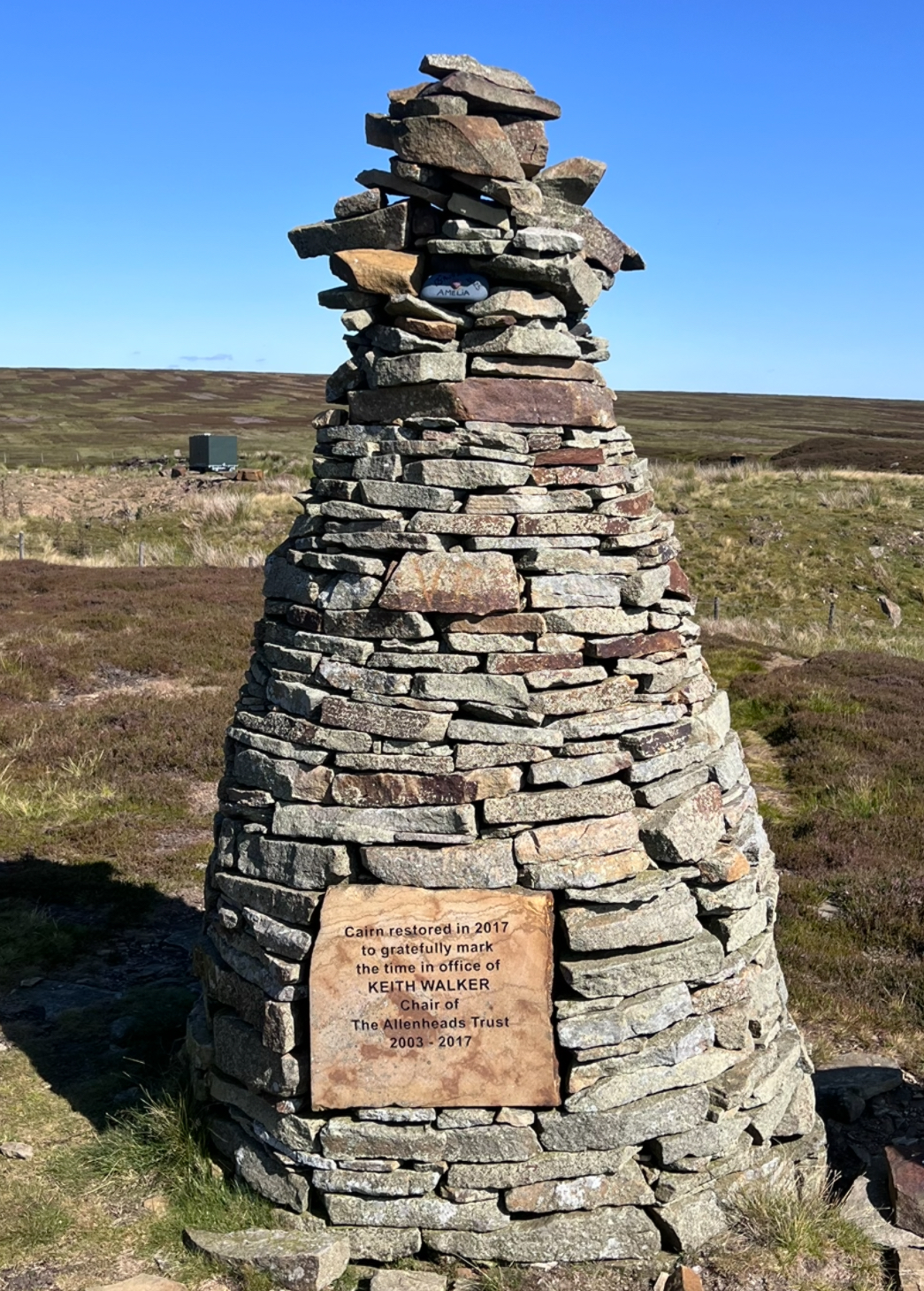
Keith Walker’s Cairn

Also In October 2017 the North Pennines Observatory was opened at the village's Old School House.

The Highforest Show is held on the first Saturday of September each year. The show is a community event, organised by a local committee, and allows the village to showcase its various talents. Each year there is usually a quoits competition, dog show and children's attractions and stalls.

== Governance ==
Allenheads is in the parliamentary constituency of Hexham; Joe Morris of the Labour Party is the Member of Parliament.

Prior to Brexit, for the European Parliament its residents voted to elect MEPs for the North East England constituency.

For Local Government purposes it belongs to Northumberland County Council, a unitary authority.
