= Toronto, County Durham =

Village in County Durham, England

Coordinates: 54.669750°N 1.6908500°W

Toronto
- Location within County Durham
- Population: 399 (2001)
- OS grid reference: NZ 19913 30754
- Unitary authority: County Durham
- Ceremonial county: County Durham
- Region: North East
- Country: England
- Sovereign state: United Kingdom
- Post town: BISHOP AUCKLAND
- Postcode district: DL14
- Dialling code: 01388
- Police: Durham
- Fire: County Durham and Darlington
- Ambulance: North East
- UK Parliament: Bishop Auckland

Toronto is a village in County Durham, England. It is situated a mile to the north-west of Bishop Auckland and was represented in Wear Valley District Council until that authority was merged into Durham County Council in April 2009. In the 2001 census Toronto had a population of 399.

== History ==
The village is named after Toronto, Ontario, Canada. The name is derived from the Mohawk word tkaronto, meaning "place where trees stand in the water". A coal baron named WC Stobart who owned land in County Durham was visiting the Canadian city in 1859 when he was told that coal had been discovered under his land. He therefore decided to call the mine Toronto, whence the village also took its name.

== Geography ==
Toronto is located on a plateau north west of Bishop Auckland in a loop of the River Wear.

== Demographics ==
Population in the village is similar to Bishop Auckland, predominantly white. The village consists of houses, mostly in traditional brick-built terraces, surrounded by agricultural land.
