= Kirk Merrington =

Village in County Durham, England

Coordinates: 54.676°N 1.596°W

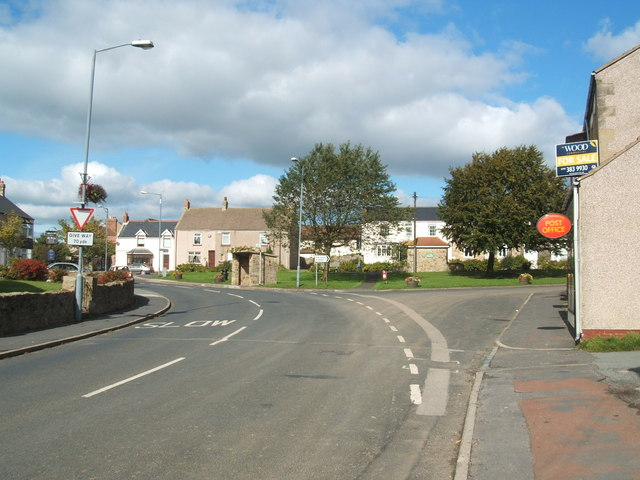
- Village green and road junction in the village centre

- Location within County Durham
- Population: 739
- OS grid reference: NZ260312
- Unitary authority: County Durham
- Ceremonial county: County Durham
- Region: North East
- Country: England
- Sovereign state: United Kingdom
- Post town: SPENNYMOOR
- Postcode district: DL16
- Police: Durham
- Fire: County Durham and Darlington
- Ambulance: North East

Kirk Merrington is a village in County Durham, in England. It is situated between the towns of Bishop Auckland and Ferryhill. It is part of the Spennymoor township.
