= Sinderhope =

Hamlet in Northumberland, England

Coordinates: 54.858°N 2.243°W

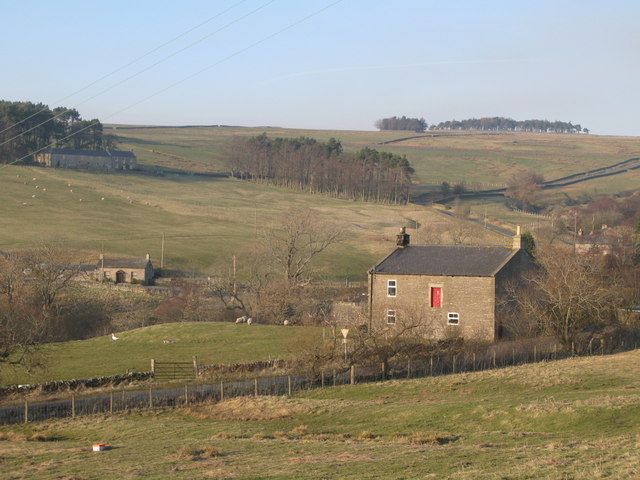

- Location within Northumberland
- OS grid reference: NY845515
- Civil parish: Allendale
- Unitary authority: Northumberland
- Ceremonial county: Northumberland
- Region: North East
- Country: England
- Sovereign state: United Kingdom
- Post town: HEXHAM
- Postcode district: NE47
- Police: Northumbria
- Fire: Northumberland
- Ambulance: North East
- UK Parliament: Hexham

Sinderhope is a hamlet situated on the east Allen Valley in south-west Northumberland. It is in the civil parish of Allendale.

The population is spread over farms in an area approximately 25 square miles (65 km^{2}). The population is around 80. The mainstay of employment is sheep-farming.

Wildlife is plentiful with many examples of rare birds of Great Britain, such as the black grouse, Eurasian whimbrel and Eurasian curlew. The local beauty spot is a ford with wild flowers and a wood called Oldman Bottom, often mistakenly called "Old Man's Bottom".

The whole area is part of the North Pennines Area of Outstanding Natural Beauty.

The community centre was once a school for the area, but now serves as a venue for various local activities

== Governance ==
Sinderhope is in the unitary authority of Northumberland County Council, represented by the Tynedale Division. It is also part of Allendale Parish Council.

Sinderhope is in the parliamentary constituency of Hexham.

== Transport ==
=== Road ===
Sinderhope is about 3 miles (5 km) from Allendale, and about 13 miles (21 km) from Hexham.

=== Bus ===
Sinderhope is served by Go North East's 688 service, which connects it to Hexham.

== Sports ==
Sinderhope is home to Sinderhope Pony Trekking Centre.

Isaac's Tea Trail, a popular walk across the North Pennines, also goes through Sinderhope.

Sinderhope is also the base of some grouse shooting activities.
