= Catton, Northumberland =

Village in Northumberland, England

Coordinates: 54.9118°N 2.2744°W

Catton
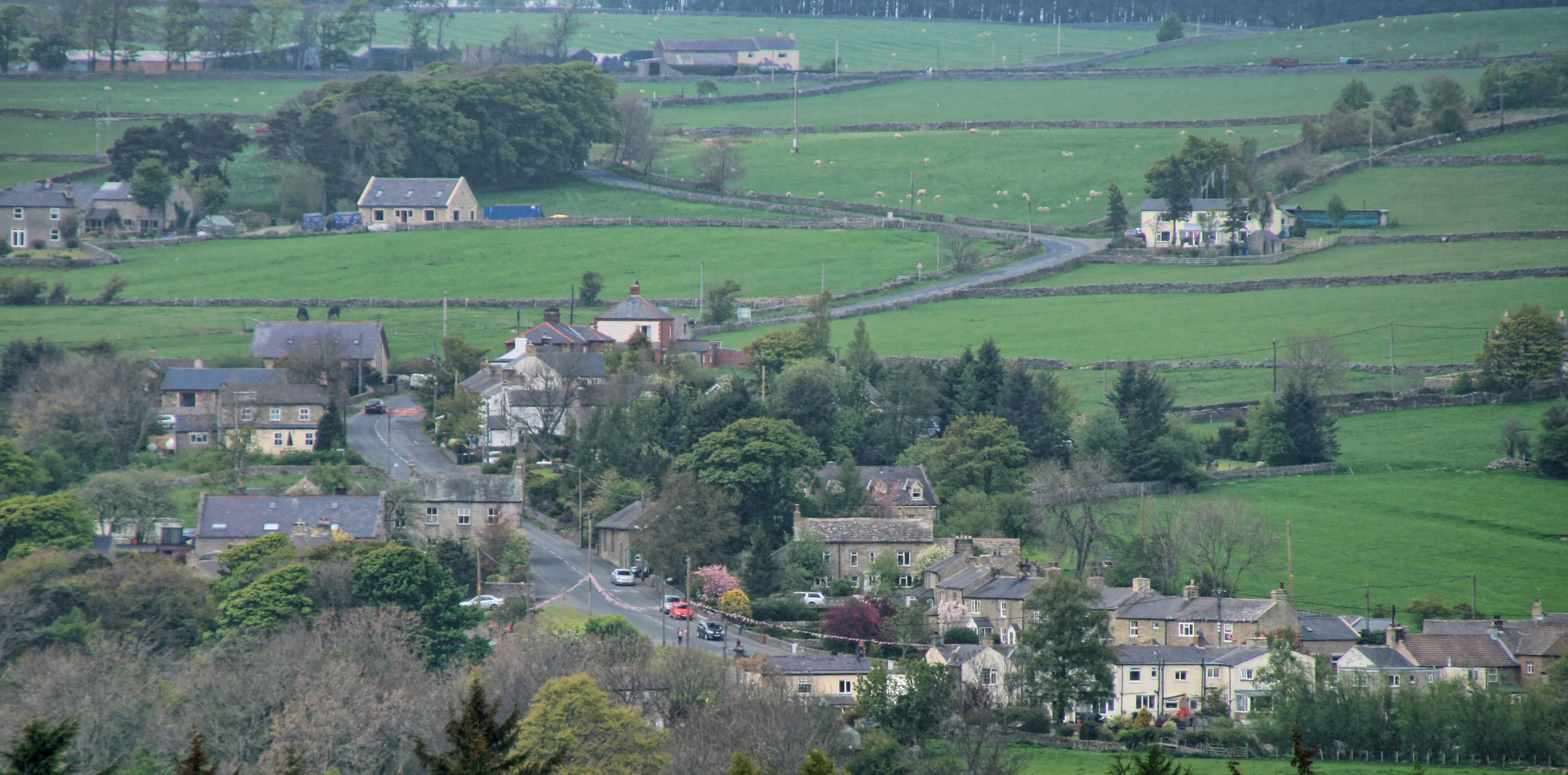
- View of Catton

- Location within Northumberland
- OS grid reference: NY825575
- Civil parish: Allendale
- Unitary authority: Northumberland
- Ceremonial county: Northumberland
- Region: North East
- Country: England
- Sovereign state: United Kingdom
- Post town: HEXHAM
- Postcode district: NE47
- Dialling code: 01434
- Police: Northumbria
- Fire: Northumberland
- Ambulance: North East
- UK Parliament: Hexham

Catton is a village in the civil parish of Allendale, in Northumberland, England. It is about 7 miles (11 km) to the southwest of Hexham and is located north of Allendale Town.

== In media ==
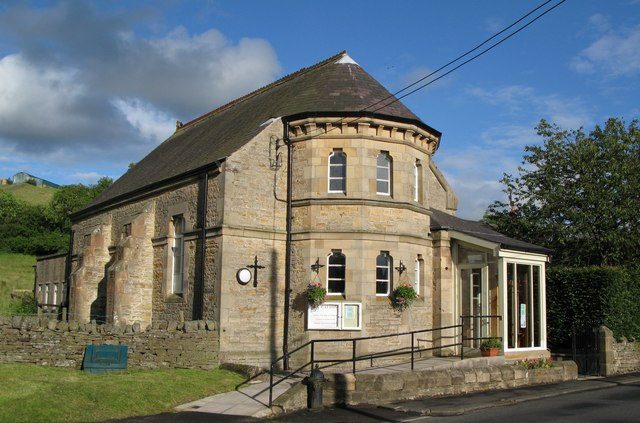
Catton Methodist Chapel

It is featured as a key location in Stewart Pringle's 2024 play The Bounds, which premiered at Live Theatre, Newcastle before transferring to the Royal Court, London.
