= Cadshaw =

Village in Lancashire, England

Coordinates: 53.661°N 2.447°W

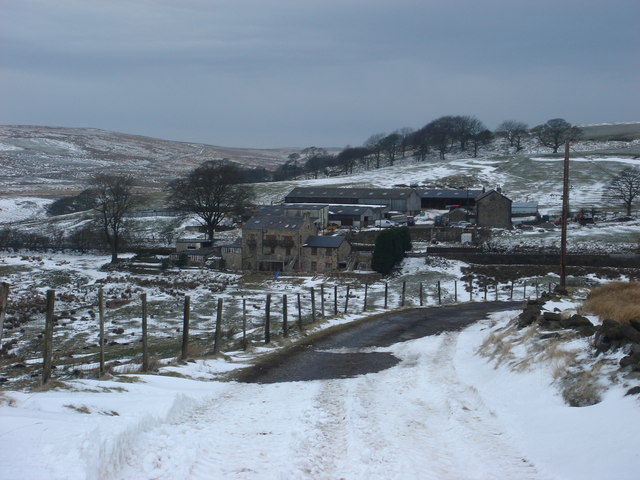
- Cadshaw farm on the A666

- Shown within Blackburn with Darwen Location within Lancashire
- OS grid reference: SD704183
- Civil parish: Darwen
- Unitary authority: Blackburn with Darwen
- Ceremonial county: Lancashire
- Region: North West
- Country: England
- Sovereign state: United Kingdom
- Post town: DARWEN
- Postcode district: BB3
- Dialling code: 01254
- Police: Lancashire
- Fire: Lancashire
- Ambulance: North West
- UK Parliament: Rossendale and Darwen

Cadshaw is a village in the unitary borough of Blackburn with Darwen, in Lancashire, England.
