= Allendale, Northumberland =

Village in Northumberland, England

Coordinates: 54.896°N 2.257°W

Allendale
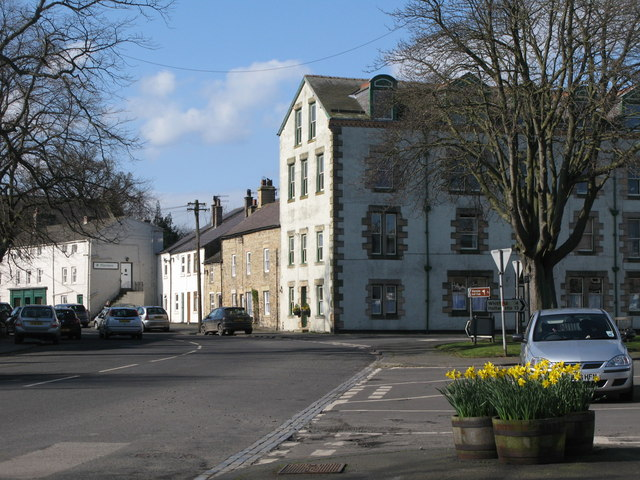
- Shield Street, Allendale Town

- Location within Northumberland
- Population: 1,983 (Parish, 2021)
- OS grid reference: NY8355
- Civil parish: Allendale
- Unitary authority: Northumberland
- Ceremonial county: Northumberland
- Region: North East
- Country: England
- Sovereign state: United Kingdom
- Post town: HEXHAM
- Postcode district: NE47
- Dialling code: 01434
- Police: Northumbria
- Fire: Northumberland
- Ambulance: North East
- UK Parliament: Hexham

Allendale, often marked on maps as Allendale Town, is a village and civil parish in south west Northumberland, England. It is located within the North Pennines Area of Outstanding Natural Beauty. At the 2021 census, the parish had a population of 1,983.

Allendale is within the North Pennines Area of Outstanding Natural Beauty (AONB); the second largest of the 40 AONB's in England and Wales. The local economy is predominantly based on agriculture (notably sheep farming) and tourism, although of late it has become a popular commuter town for Newcastle upon Tyne.

Allendale is located around 11 miles (18 km) by road from Hexham, its post town, and around 34 miles (55 km) from both Carlisle and Newcastle upon Tyne.

== History ==
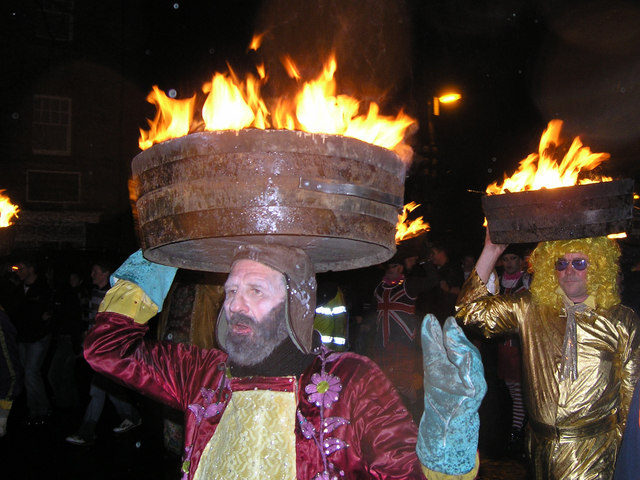
Guisers carry lighted tar barrels during the New Year fire festival, a tradition dating back to 1858.

Allendale refers to the "dale" or valley of the River Allen. Evidence of prehistoric settlement has been found on the surrounding moorland. In the 16th century this area, close to the Scottish border, was a lawless and troubled place. Fortified farmhouses known as 'bastles' were constructed to protect residents and livestock against reiver raids. Allendale has a concentration of bastles, around 40 can still be seen, many as scenic ruins.

Local mining for lead has occurred since Roman times, with the first smelting mill being constructed in the 1600s. The significant growth of Allendale Town and the surrounding villages was fuelled by that of the local lead-mining and smelting industries in the 19th century. The remains of two flues from the former smelting mill (between Allendale and Catton) run to chimneys up on the fells high above the village. The smelting mill is now home to the Allendale Brewery and the Allenmills Regeneration Project. In 1874 Allendale Co-operative Society was established.

In 1869, the Hexham and Allendale Railway was opened to provide improved transport, but its opening coincided with a rapid decline in the industry due to cheap imports of lead. The last mines in the area closed in 1894 (although an attempt was made to re-open the mine at Allenheads in the 1970s).

With the closure of the lead mines, the population rapidly declined and Allendale became a popular tourist destination for Edwardian Tynesiders seeking a country escape. The railway was finally closed to passengers in 1930 and to goods in 1950, when the local terminus was bought by the stationmaster and opened as a caravan park.

Popularly held to be the town or dale that is referenced in Charles Jefferys' and Sidney Nelson's 1835 ballad The Rose of Allandale, published in the New York Mirror, and later sung by Paddy Reilly, The Dubliners and many others, it seems more likely that this song is either metaphorical or refers literally to the community on Allan Water in the Scottish Highlands at the beginning of the Firth of Forth. The explicit reference to Allendale, moreover, in 'Lucy Gray of Allendale', a musical setting of the earliest known work by Cumbrian poet Robert Anderson, manages to get the spelling of the town correctly.

=== New Year fire festival ===
The town's New Year celebrations involve lighted tar barrels that are carried on the heads of revellers called guisers. This tradition dates back so far that it is untraceable, with definitive evidence only back to the mid-1800s. It appears to have originated from the lighting of a silver band that was carolling at New Year. They were unable to use candles to light their music because of strong winds, so someone suggested that a tar barrel be used. As the band had to move from place to place, it was easier to carry the barrels upon the guisers' heads, rather than rolling them. The festival's origins are unclear, with claims for both pagan and Christian roots.

== Governance ==
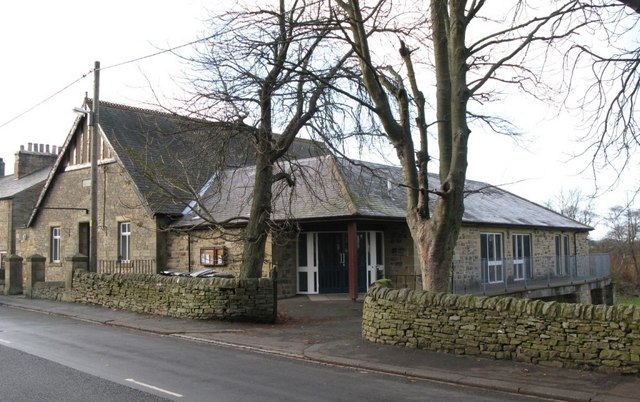
Allendale Village Hall

There are two tiers of local government covering Allendale, at parish and unitary authority level: Allendale Parish Council and Northumberland County Council. The parish council generally meets at Allendale Village Hall.

For national elections, Allendale forms part of the Hexham constituency.

=== Administrative history ===
Allendale was historically part of the ancient parish of Hexham, which in turn formed part of the county palatine of Hexhamshire. The county palatine was abolished in 1572, when its area was absorbed into Northumberland. Allendale had its own chapel of ease from medieval times, and the chapelry of Allendale took on civil parish functions under the poor laws from the 17th century onwards. In 1767, Allendale also became independent from Hexham for ecclesiastical purposes when a grant from Queen Anne's Bounty allowed the chapelry to fund its own clergy.

The parish of Allendale then covered the two neighbouring valleys of Allendale itself along the East Allen river and West Allendale along the West Allen river. The parish was subdivided into a number of townships and also had an extensive area of common land known as Allendale Common. In 1792, an Act of Parliament was passed for the division of common land in Hexhamshire and Allendale Common. In 1897, the townships in West Allendale were constituted a separate civil parish called West Allen. Allendale Common was deemed to be common to both the reduced parish of Allendale and the new parish of West Allen, making for very complicated parish boundaries. The boundaries between Allendale and West Allen were eventually simplified in 1987, when Allendale Common was split between the two parishes.

== Economy ==
The village hosts a health centre, village shop, Post Office, a store operated by Allendale Co-operative Society, brewery, butchers, chemist, gift shop, tea-room, art-cafe, beauty and holistic healing centre, and several pubs.

Owing to its location, Allendale is a popular country holiday destination. There are a number of holiday cottages in and around the village as well as a caravan park.

The Museum of Classic Sci-Fi is housed in a cellar in the village.

== Public services ==
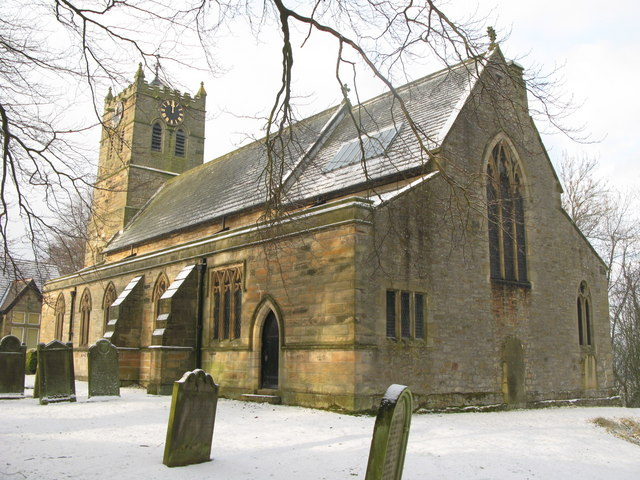
Anglican church of St. Cuthbert's in winter

Allendale hosts a scout group and there is an active village hall that hosts regular events. Allendale Library is located at Dawson Place in the village square.

There is also a fire station in the town.

The local community is served both by the Anglican Church of St. Cuthbert's and a Methodist chapel.

== Transport ==
=== Air ===
The nearest airports are Carlisle Lake District Airport and Newcastle International Airport, which are located around 29 and 32 miles (47 and 51 km) from the village by road respectively.

=== Bus ===
The village is served by Go North East's 688 bus service, which links Allenheads, Sinderhope and Allendale with Catton, Langley and Hexham.

=== Rail ===
The nearest railway stations are located at Hexham and Haydon Bridge, both of which are on the Tyne Valley Line, which runs between Newcastle and Carlisle. From Hexham, three trains per hour run to Newcastle, with two trains per hour to Carlisle. A less regular service is provided at Haydon Bridge, with 19 trains per day to Newcastle and 17 trains per day to Carlisle.

=== Road ===
Allendale is located around 11 miles (18 km) by road from the town of Hexham, and 34 miles (55 km) from both Carlisle and Newcastle upon Tyne.

== Sports ==
Allen Valley Angling and Conservation provides permits to fish the River East Allen and supports conservation efforts to improve fish stock and riverside access. The river is home to wild brown trout and visiting spawning sea trout and salmon.

Allendale Sports Club operates senior and junior football clubs and other associated sports groups, including a local league netball team. It also has 4 full size tennis courts. The Allen Valley Striders running club welcomes runners of all abilities, including novices, and is also based at the Allendale Sports Club.

Allendale Golf Club was founded in 1906.

Allendale Cricket Club fields two weekly teams and is affiliated with both the Northumberland Cricket Board and the West Tyne Senior Cricket League.

Each Spring, the Allendale Challenge is a fell challenge walk. Organised by the North of Tyne Mountain Rescue Team the 25 miles (40 km) route covers some of the peat bogs in the North Pennines on an anti-clockwise loop from Allendale town.

There is a Bowling Green adjacent to the Village Hall..

== Awards ==
The village was the all-England winner of the Calor Village of The Year competition (2007). The Calor Village of the Year competition was organised annually by Community Action Northumberland with sponsorship provided by LPG supplier Calor.

== In popular culture ==
Allendale is featured as a key location in Stewart Pringle's 2024 play The Bounds, which premiered at Live Theatre, Newcastle before transferring to the Royal Court, London.

== Notable people ==
- Philip Larkin (poet)

== Sources ==
- Smailes, AE (1960). North England. Edinburgh: Thomas Nelson & Sons Ltd.
