= Hamsterley Mill =

Village in County Durham, England

Coordinates: 54.9020°N 1.7812°W

Hamsterley Mill is a village in County Durham, around 3 miles from Burnopfield and approximately the same distance from Consett.
