= Thomas Staniforth (priest) =

- Born: 11 February 1807; Ranelagh Street, Liverpool, England
- Died: 1887 (aged 80); Storrs Hall, Windermere
- Occupation: Priest
- Known for: first crew captain Oxford at The Boat Race 1829
- Spouse: Harriet Turner (m. 1837; died 1887)
- Parents: Samuel Staniforth; Mary Littledale

Thomas Staniforth (1807–1887) was an English clergyman who resided at Storrs Hall, Windermere, England. He is notable as the first crew captain for Oxford at The Boat Race 1829.

== Early life ==
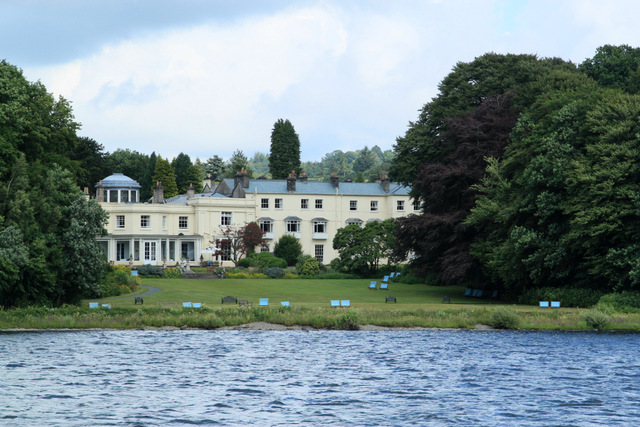
Storrs Hall, Windermere

Thomas Staniforth was the son of Samuel Staniforth and Mary Littledale, and the grandson of Thomas Staniforth, another former Lord Mayor of Liverpool, descended from the Staniforths of Darnall Hall. He was educated at Christ Church, Oxford, matriculating in 1826 and graduating B.A. in 1830. He captained the first Oxford crew at The Boat Race 1829, a team that included Charles Wordsworth, Thomas Garnier amongst others.

== Career ==
During his working life, Staniforth was a rector at Bolton-by-Bowland in Lancashire between the years 1831–1859.

Staniforth retired and moved into Storrs Hall at Windermere in 1859, after it was passed down to him by his godfather John Bolton. He remained there until his death in 1887. He never had any children and the property was sold. In his will he left a large sum of money to his grand-nephew Edwin Wilfred Greenwood, the son of politician John Greenwood. Thomas named Edwin as Edwin Stanyforth and so Edwin changed his name. Edwin would go on to father English cricket captain R. T. Stanyforth.
