= Edwin Wilfrid Stanyforth =

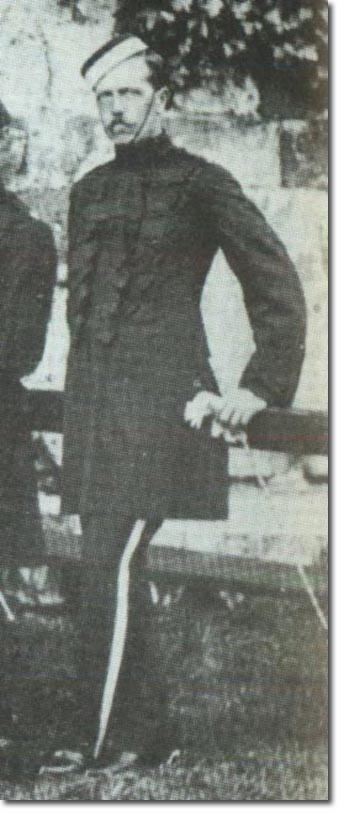
- Edwin Wilfrid Stanyforth in 1893
- Born: 28 June 1861; Birstwith, Yorkshire, England
- Died: 29 January 1939 (aged 77); Kirk Hammerton, Yorkshire, England
- Occupation: Army officer
- Spouse: Mary Evelyn Barnadiston
- Children: Monica Greenwood Madge Stanyforth; Ronald Thomas Stanyforth
- Parent(s): John Greenwood, Louisa Elizabeth Barnardiston

Lieutenant-Colonel Edwin Wilfrid Stanyforth CB TD DL JP (born Greenwood; 28 June 1861 – 28 January 1939) was a Yorkshire land owner, magistrate and British Army Territorial officer who commanded the Yorkshire Hussars during World War I. He was appointed Companion of the Order of the Bath (CB) in the 1924 Birthday Honours for services to agriculture.

== Personal life ==
He was born to John Greenwood and Louisa Elizabeth Barnardiston. His father built Swarcliffe Hall where the family resided, and his grandfather Frederick Greenwood was a noted magistrate in West Yorkshire.

Stanyforth was educated at Eton College and Christ Church, Oxford. He studied agriculture, later becoming a President of the Royal Agricultural Society of England. He was a noted breeder of shorthorn cattle, west highland bullocks and Jersey cattle.

He was a member of the West Riding Territorial Association and served in the Yorkshire Hussars. He obtained command of the Hussars in 1913 and was for a time in charge of the coastal defences at Scarborough.

His grandmother Sarah Staniforth was the daughter of Samuel Staniforth, former Lord Mayor of Liverpool, and the sister of Rev. Thomas Staniforth of Storrs Hall. When Thomas died, Edwin assumed the name and arms of the family. This was carried out on 7 December 1887 by Royal Licence.

Stanyforth married his cousin Mary Evelyn Barnadiston in 1888 and had three children: two daughters, Madge and Monica, who was raised in Paris, and a son, Ronald Thomas Stanyforth, who would go on to become captain of the England cricket team. The family resided at Kirk Hammerton Hall.
