= R. T. Stanyforth =

English cricketer and Army officer

Rony Stanyforth CVO MC
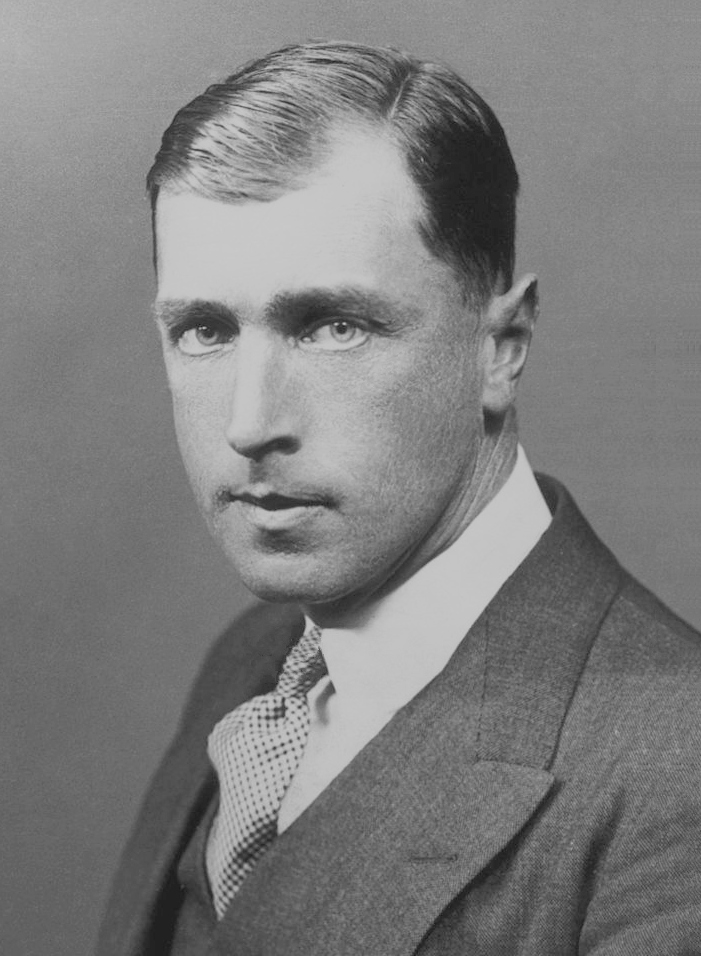
- Stanyforth in 1927

Personal information
- Full name: Ronald Thomas Stanyforth
- Born: 30 May 1892; Chelsea, London, England
- Died: 20 February 1964 (aged 71); Kirk Hammerton, Yorkshire, England
- Batting: Right-handed
- Bowling: Wicket-keeper

International information
- National side: England
- Test debut: 24 December 1927 v South Africa
- Last Test: 1 February 1928 v South Africa

Career statistics
Competition	Test	First-class
Matches	4	61
Runs scored	13	1,092
Batting average	2.60	17.33
100s/50s	0/0	0/6
Top score	6*	91
Catches/stumpings	7/2	72/21
- Source: Cricinfo, 15 August 2022

Lieutenant-Colonel Ronald Thomas "Rony" Stanyforth, CVO, MC (30 May 1892 – 20 February 1964) was an Army officer and English amateur first-class cricketer, who played for Yorkshire County Cricket Club and England, captaining England in the four Test matches he played in.

Stanyforth was born at Chelsea, London, England, the son of Edwin Wilfrid Stanyforth (born Edwin Wilfrid Greenwood) of Kirk Hammerton Hall, Yorkshire. He was educated at Eton and Christ Church, Oxford. He played for Oxford University in 1914 and then served in World War I. He was awarded the MC and CVO.

After the war Stanyforth played for Combined Services in 1922, Army from 1923 to 1929, Marylebone Cricket Club (MCC) from 1923 to 1933 and H. D. G. Leveson Gower's XI in 1926. In 1926 he played one game for Langholm Cricket Club after being invited to by the Earl of Dalkeith.

After Guy Jackson, the original choice as captain, fell ill just before the tour was to commence, Stanyforth, a wicket-keeper, captained England on the tour to South Africa in 1927–28. Under his captaincy in the first four Test matches, England won two, lost one and drew once. However, the series was a draw as the fifth Test, when Greville Stevens stood in for the injured Stanyforth, was lost.

Only three of Stanyforth's 61 first-class games were played for Yorkshire County Cricket Club in the County Championship. All three came in 1928 after he had captained England. He also played for the Free Foresters from 1930 to 1933.

Stanyforth retired from the Army in 1930 and became Comptroller of the Household to the Duke of Gloucester. He rejoined the Army at the outbreak of the Second World War, serving in the 21st Lancers, as Aide-de-camp to General Alan Brooke from 1939 to 1940, and as GSO1 21st Army Group from 1941 to 1945. He returned to the Duke of Gloucester's service in 1947 as extra equerry.

Stanyforth died at Kirk Hammerton, Yorkshire, in February 1964, aged 72. He was a trustee of the MCC at the time of his death, and the author of Wicketkeeping, published in 1935.

== Family ==
Stanyforth was the great-great-grandson of Samuel Staniforth and the great-great-great-grandson of Thomas Staniforth, each of whom served as Lord Mayor of Liverpool. His father Edwin Stanyforth was born Edwin Greenwood, however he changed his name at the request of his great uncle Rev. Thomas Staniforth of Storrs Hall in his will. Edwin was the son of Ripon member of parliament and resident of Swarcliffe Hall, John Greenwood.

Sporting positions
Preceded by Arthur Carr	English national cricket captain 1927/8	Succeeded by Percy Chapman
