= John Greenwood (MP) =

English politician (1821–1874)

John Greenwood JP
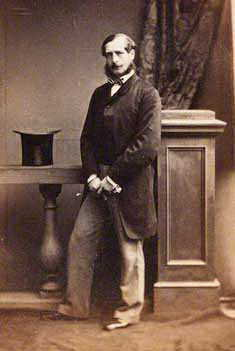
- Greenwood c1870

Member of Parliament for Ripon
- In office 27 March 1857 – 12 July 1865
- Preceded by: Edwin Lascelles
- Succeeded by: Robert Kearsley

Personal details
- Born: John Greenwood; 4 February 1821 Ryshworth Hall, Bradford, UK
- Died: 21 February 1874 (aged 53) Pimlico, Middlesex, UK
- Party: Liberal (1859–)
- Other political affiliations: Whigs (–1859)
- Spouse: Louisa Elizabeth Barnardiston
- Children: Frederick, Charles, Edwin, Hubert & Clara
- Parents: Frederick Greenwood (father); Sarah Staniforth (mother)
- Education: Lincoln's Inn

John Greenwood (born 4 February 1821 in Ryshworth Hall, near Bradford; died 21 February 1874, Pimlico, Middlesex) was an English politician who served as Liberal M.P for Ripon, then in the West Riding of Yorkshire.

== Family life ==
John Greenwood was the only son of Frederick Greenwood and Sarah Staniforth. The Greenwood family resided at Swarcliffe Hall near Harrogate and well regarded in the area. His mother was the daughter of Samuel Staniforth and the granddaughter of Thomas Staniforth who both held the title of Lord Mayor of Liverpool, and who originated from the Staniforth family that built Darnall Hall in Sheffield.

He was a student of Lincoln's Inn and earned a B.A in 1851 and M.A in 1860.

He married Louisa Elizabeth Barnardiston, the daughter of Nathaniel Clarke Barnardiston and Sophia Eyres, the eldest daughter of George Robert Eyres Esq and Louisa Grace Parker, on the 19 February 1852 and had four sons, Frederick Barnardiston Greenwood, Charles Staniforth Greenwood, Edwin Wilfred Greenwood and Hubert John Greenwood. They also had a daughter Clara Louisa Greenwood (died 1887) who married Francis Edward Fitzalan-Howard, the Lord Howard of Glossop.

He was the grandfather of English Cricket player R. T. Stanyforth through his son Edwin.

== Career ==
John served as a Liberal Member of Parliament for the Ripon constituency in the then West Riding of Yorkshire town of Ripon between 1853 and 1865. He was a Justice of the peace for Yorkshire and also served as a Major for the Yorkshire Hussars Yeomanry.

John Greenwood's Signature

In 1848 he engaged architect Major Rohde Hawkins, the husband of his only sister Mary Littledale Greenwood to build what would become the present Swarcliffe Hall.

He died at the Grosvenor Hotel in Pimlico, London, on 21 February 1874.
