= Darnall =

Suburb of Sheffield in South Yorkshire, England

Coordinates: 53.38°N 1.41°W

- Suburb
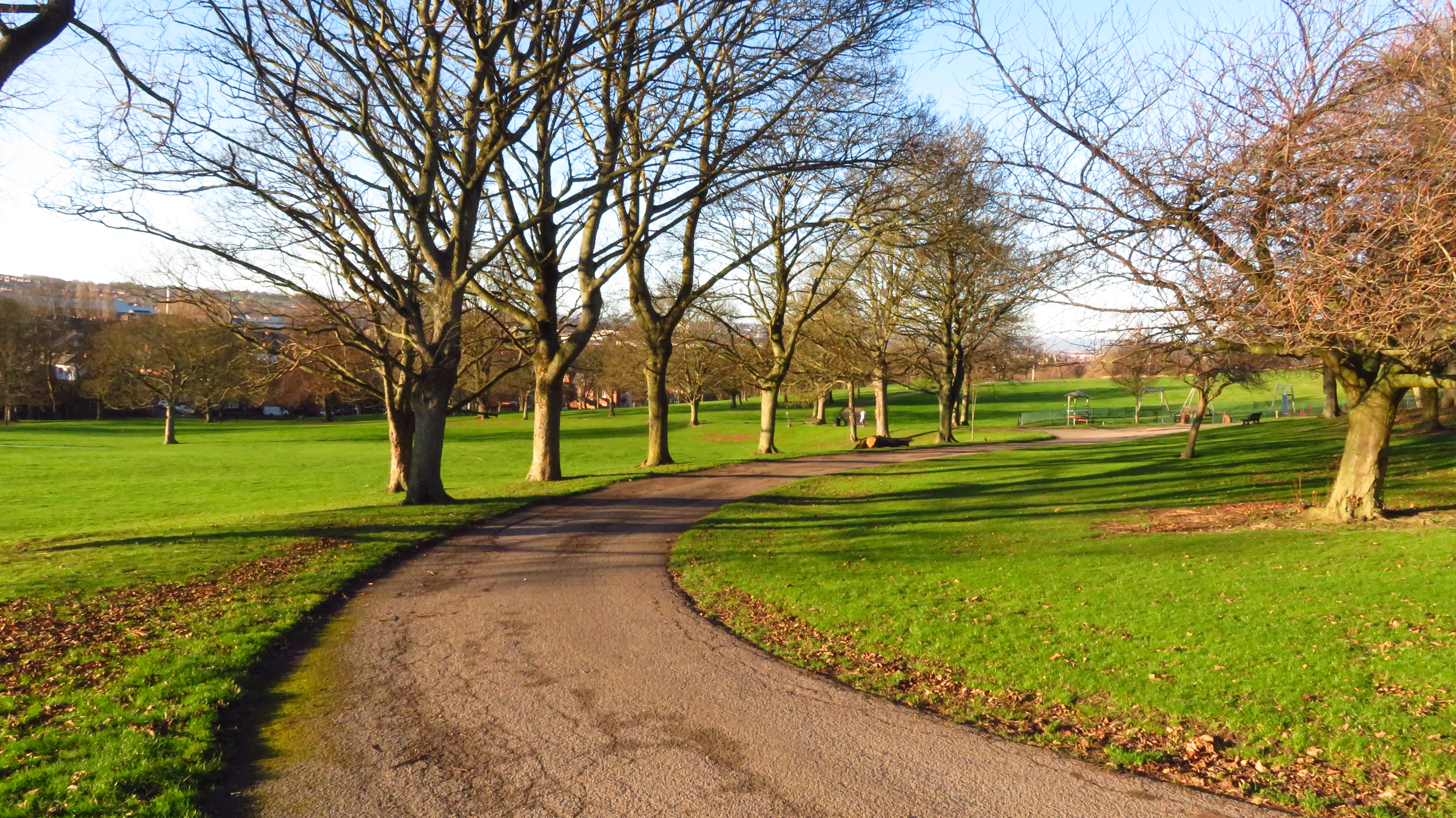
- High Hazels Park

- Location within Sheffield
- Population: 10,672
- OS grid reference: SK3988
- Metropolitan borough: City of Sheffield
- Metropolitan county: South Yorkshire
- Region: Yorkshire and the Humber
- Country: England
- Sovereign state: United Kingdom
- Post town: SHEFFIELD
- Postcode district: S9
- Dialling code: 0114
- Police: South Yorkshire
- Fire: South Yorkshire
- Ambulance: Yorkshire
- UK Parliament: Sheffield South East

Darnall is a suburb of eastern Sheffield, South Yorkshire, England. Darnall is approximately 3 miles (5 km) east-north-east of Sheffield city centre.

== History ==
Darnall was initially a small hamlet usually included with Attercliffe. William Walker, a resident of the settlement, is one of several people rumoured to have been the executioner of Charles I of England. A hall, known as Darnall Hall was built by the Staniforth family in the centre of Darnall in 1723; in 1845 this became a private "lunatic asylum". Darnall had a population of 10,672 in 2011. (Note: Darnall is made up of 37 output areas South of Greenland and North of Handsworth.)

The Darnall New Ground was laid out for cricket in the 1820s. Although only used for a few years before being replaced by a ground at Hyde Park, it was described as the finest in England.

Holy Trinity church, the first in Darnall, was built in 1840, followed by a hospital in 1855 and a school in 1875. By the mid-nineteenth century, it was a centre for farming and coal mining, and was known for its amateur greyhound racing. Industry was also important, with the Don Glass Works established around 1793, augmented by the Darnall Works steel foundry from 1835.

In the later 19th century, the area was built up to house steelworkers working in the large foundries of the Lower Don Valley. Darnall railway station was built on the Sheffield to Lincoln line to serve the suburb. Unemployment grew as the foundries shut or laid off many employees from the 1970s on, and the area is now one of the poorest in the city.

A mix of council housing, 1880s steelworkers' cottages, small terrace housing and 1930s private semi-detached houses make up the accommodation within the Darnall area.

== Demography ==
Demographic changes over the years have reduced the population with a consequent reduction in the number of school-age children in the district. There are two primary schools in the area, High Hazels Academy and Phillimore Community Primary School. Secondary level schools outside the area provide education for children aged over 11 years.

Darnall has a large immigrant community, including many Muslims (primarily of Pakistani and Bangladeshi origin). The suburb has several mosques.

== Business and commerce ==
In 2003, Morrisons supermarkets pulled out of the district after over 20 years being a significant local hub for the local community, relocating to a new purpose-built store two miles away in Catcliffe.

== Sport and leisure ==
High Hazels Park is the major open space in this area of the city.

Darnall was represented in the FA Cup during the 1920s by Darnall Welfare.

== Notable people ==
- Cecil Marsh, professional footballer
- Charles Mozley, artist and art teacher
- Charles Peace, notorious 19th-century murderer and burglar
- Thomas Staniforth, Lord Mayor of Liverpool from 1797 to 1798
- Samuel Staniforth, Lord Mayor of Liverpool from 1812 to 1813, son of the above named

=== Gallery ===
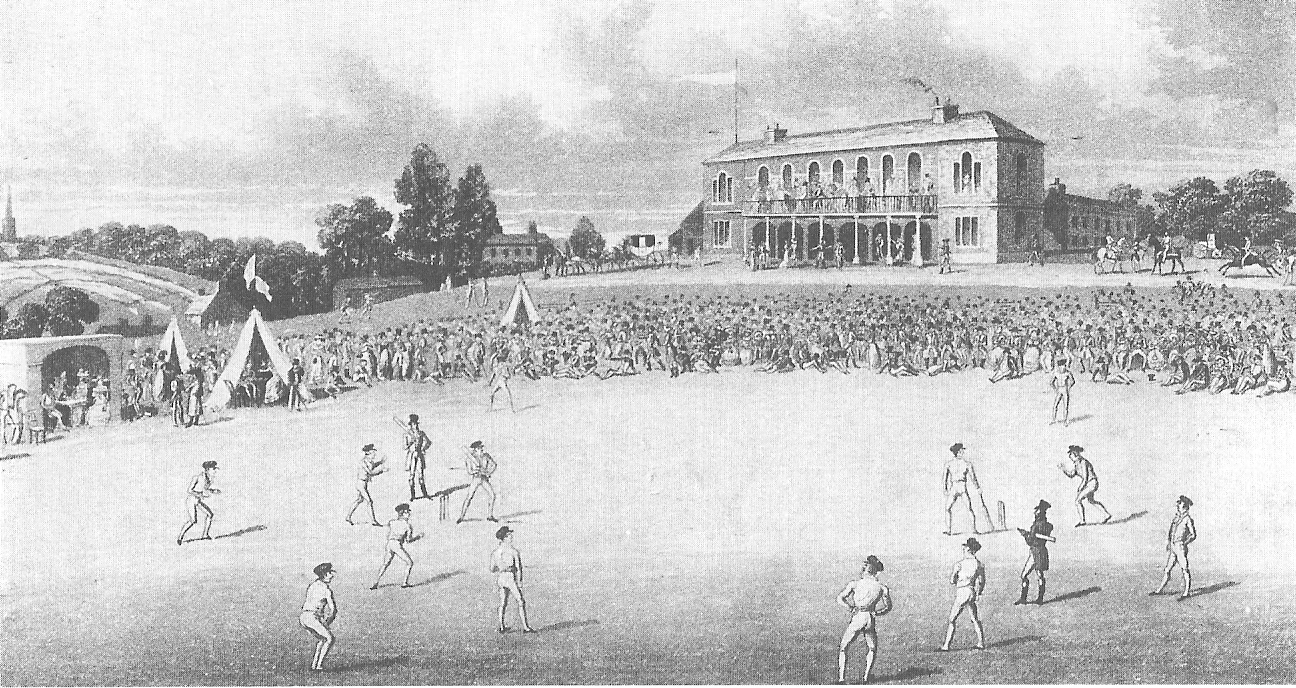
A cricket match at Darnall in the 1820s

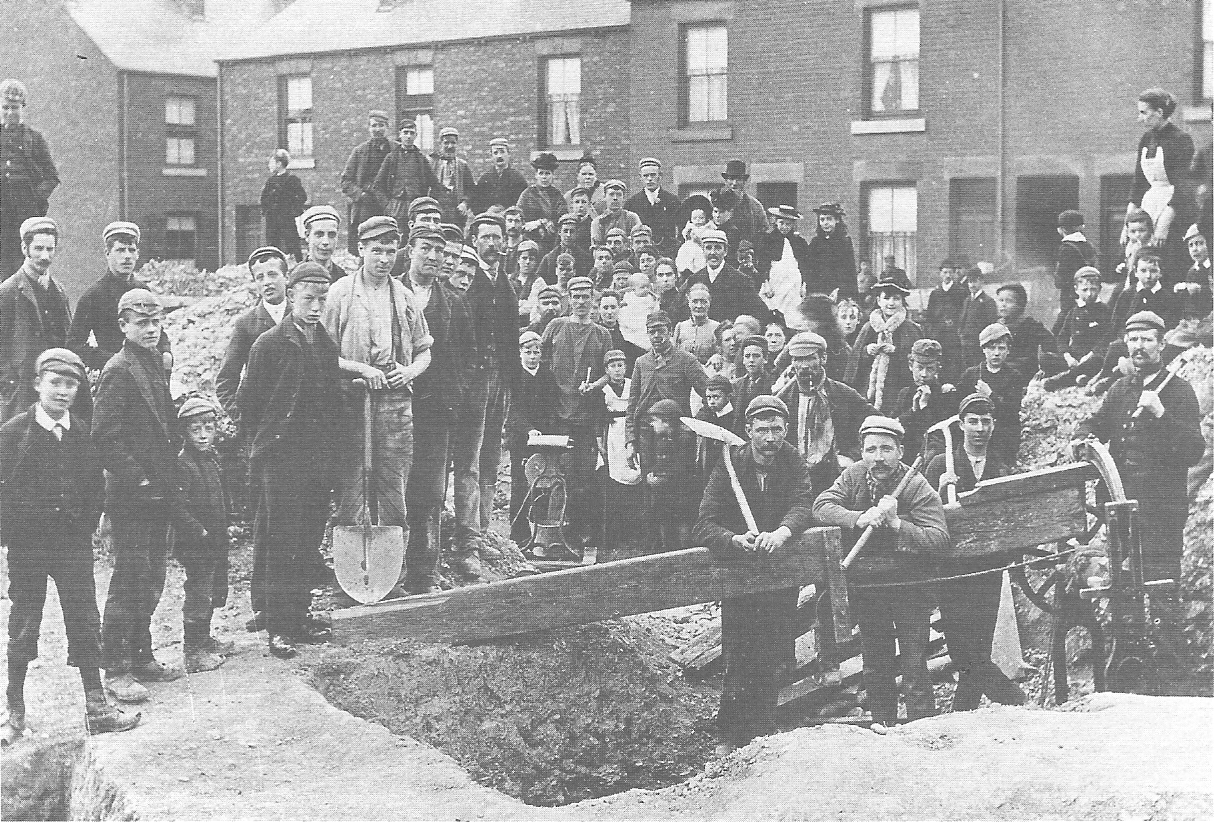
Striking coal miners in 1893 in Darnall
