= Liverpool slave trade =

Involvement of Liverpool in the Transalantic Slave Trade

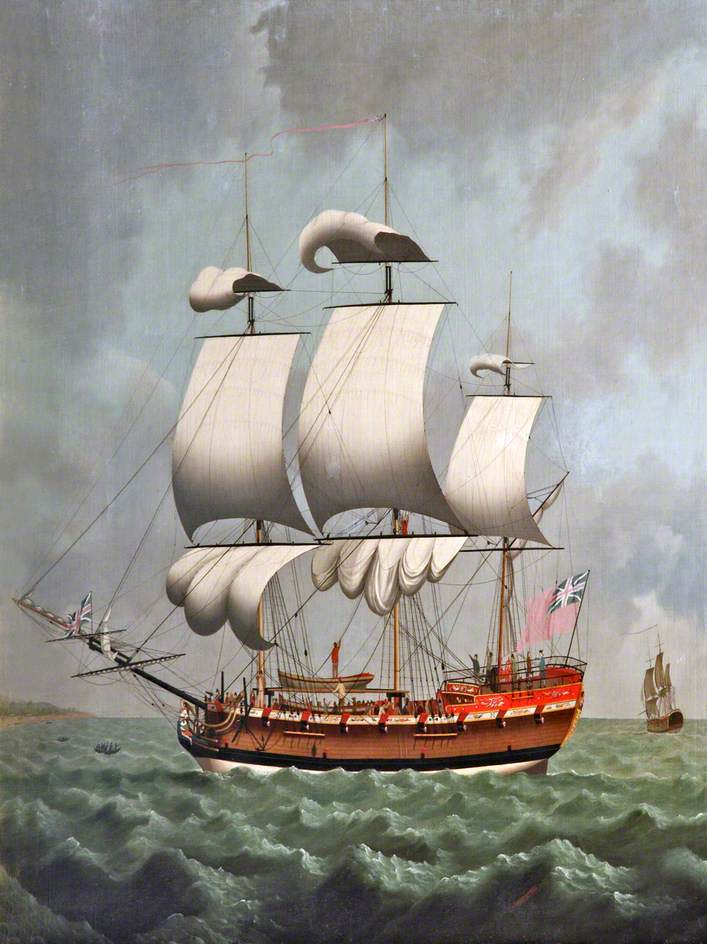
A Liverpool Slave Ship by William Jackson (c.1770–c.1803)

Liverpool, a port city in north-west England, was involved in the transatlantic slave trade. The trade developed in the eighteenth century, as Liverpool slave traders took part in the highly profitable triangular trade. Trade goods (tools, nails, etc.) were sent to the Bight of Biafra, sold there for a profit and slaves bought, the ships then crossed the Atlantic to the Americas and the slaves were sold there for a profit and agricultural products (tobacco, cotton, sugar cane) bought, before the ships returned to Liverpool. There the cotton, for example, was sold to the cotton mills in the industrializing North of England to produce fabric.

== History ==
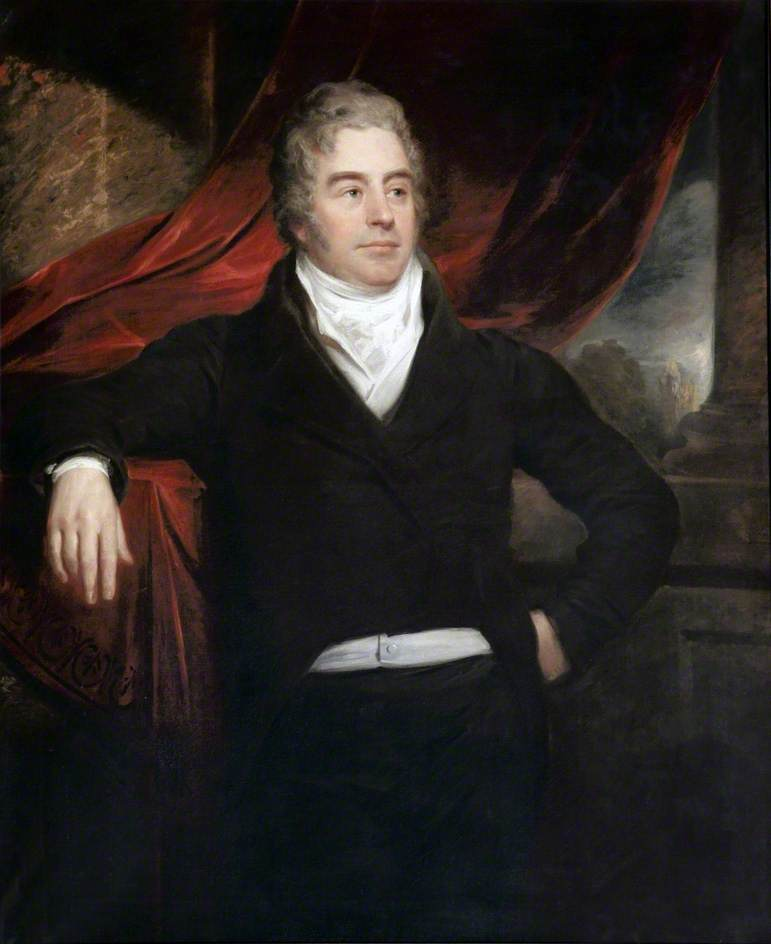
John Bolton, Liverpool slave trader.

On 1 December 1699 the successful tobacco and sugar merchant William Clayton, owner of the ship "Liverpool Merchant", sent his ship to Africa, where the captain William Webster bought a number of enslaved Africans; 220 were sold in Barbados. This is thought to be the first known ship to sail from Liverpool to transport slaves to the New World. Another Liverpool vessel, the "Blessing", set sail in 1700. Over the next 30 years Liverpool grew rapidly. The growth in shipping out of Liverpool began to increase slowly over the next 30–40 years with ties to the American colonies firmly established by 1700; merchants were transporting sugar and tobacco from the colonies. Liverpool was transformed from "not much more than a fishing village" due to an extensive rise in the manufacturing of textiles, iron, and firearms and gunpowder. In the years of growth Liverpool goods were being exported from the Liverpool port with the first commercial wet dock being built in 1715, and by 1730 there were 15 Liverpool slave ships headed toward Africa where the goods manufactured in Liverpool were exchanged for slaves.

From the mid 1740s Liverpool was the largest slave trading port in Britain, overtaking Bristol. By 1750 Liverpool was the pre-eminent slave trading port in Great Britain. Thereafter Liverpool's control of the industry continued to grow. In the period between 1793 and 1807, when the slave trade was abolished, Liverpool accounted for 84.7% of all slave voyages, with London accounting for 12% and Bristol 3.3%.

After 1780, the Liverpool slave trade reached its height, and there was no shortage of docking facilities at the Port of Liverpool. The local government, the Liverpool Corporation, was unusual for its time because of its financial strength; and it invested £1 million in six new docks during the 18th century. Liverpool's docks were also used for ship building; they built 26 per cent of the total UK shipping involved in the slave trade, a total of 2,120 ships between 1701 and 1810. In comparison, the next two biggest slave ports, London and Bristol, combined, built less than half of the slave ships built in Liverpool.

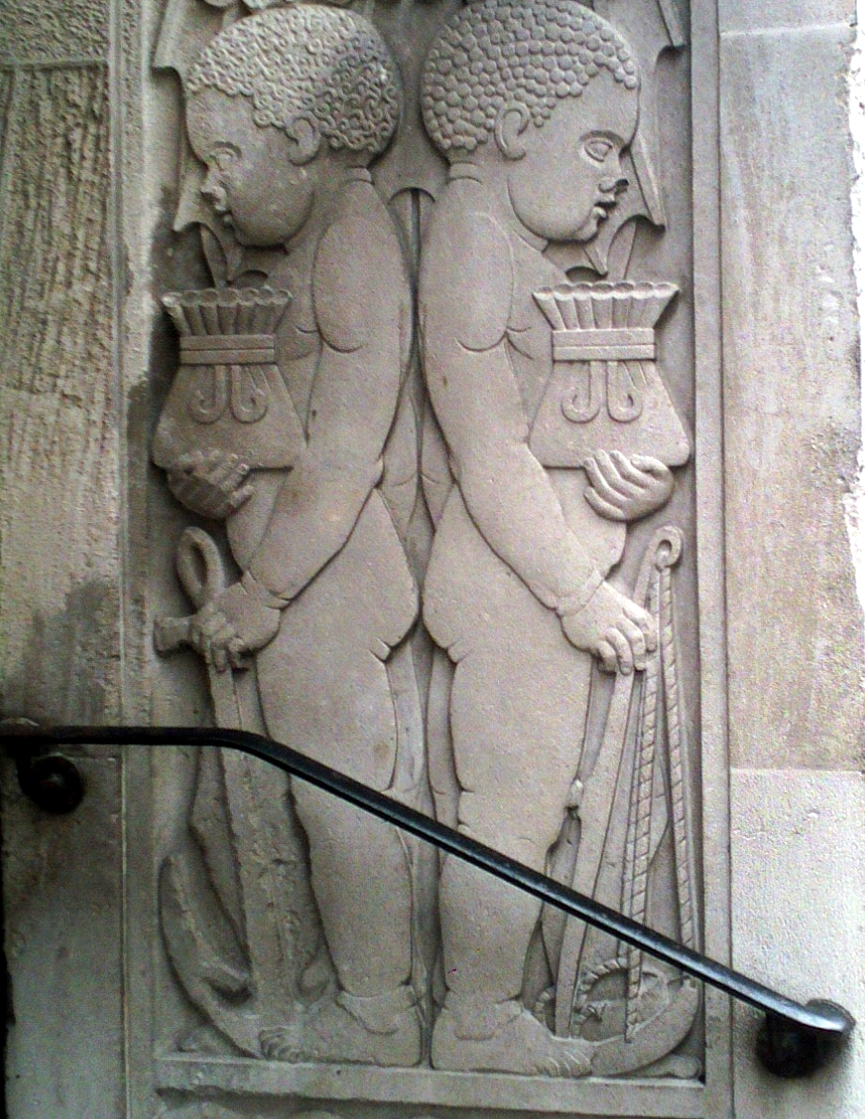
Slave relief on Martins Bank Liverpool building.

Liverpool's growth as a slave trade port was caused by locational advantages: in time of war, Bristol and London ships would have to sail closer to mainland Europe before making a crossing to North America and the West Indies. In contrast Liverpool ships could sail north of Ireland after leaving port. A second advantage was Liverpool's close association with the nearby Isle of Man. Until 1765 the island had tax free status, allowing Dutch East Indiamen vessels to warehouse goods that could then be picked up by Liverpool ships for onward travel into the Atlantic Ocean without paying landing fees to the UK government. A third reason for Liverpool's ascendency in the slave trade was the city's close proximity to the industrialising North of England. Liverpool slave traders could readily source goods to be traded for enslaved people: the African slave traders in particular favoured trading in cotton goods, a major industry in Lancashire.

Liverpool's slave traders bought captives across the whole of West Africa; however they specialised in the Bight of Biafra and West Central Africa. From 1740 to 1810 they took 427,000 people from the Bight of Biafra and 197,000 from West Central Africa.

Liverpool traders maintained a close relationship with African trading chiefs, and developed a network of African contacts. Liverpool also specialised in their delivery areas: they sold 391,000 enslaved people to Jamaica alone between 1741 and 1810, and in the same period 85,000 enslaved people to Barbados. They were dominant in most slave markets except for Chesapeake, where Bristol remained the biggest importer.

== African Company of Merchants ==
See also: List of Liverpool members of the African Company of Merchants

The African Company Act 1750 set up the replacement of the Royal African Company with the African Company of Merchants. This act specified that the slave trade should be "free and open to all his Majesty's subjects". However it further stipulated that "all his Majesty's subjects, who shall trade to or from any of the ports or places of Africa, between Cape Blanco, and the Cape of Good Hope, shall for ever hereafter be a body corporate and politick, in name, and in deed, by the name of The Company of Merchants trading to Africa". The act then created an organisational outline for the African Company of Merchants based around the localities of London, Bristol and Liverpool. This stipulated how all merchants wishing to join should pay 40 shillings to an identified person in their city, with provision for the members of each city to elect three committee members to run the corporation. The town clerk of Liverpool was given responsibility in that city. On 24 June 1752, 101 merchants formally joined the company.

== Street names ==
Many of Liverpool’s merchants during the 18th century prospered from international trade. They dealt in goods such as sugar, coffee, tobacco or cotton which were produced by slaves. So streets might have been named for citizens who built their fortunes and status in part from the slave trade. In some cases, their prominence came in part from the slave trade itself. This fact is now being recognised.

Even so, some street names are simply a coincidence. Many mayors were also slave owners or traders. Penny Lane, for example, has often been linked with slave ship owner James Penny, but an investigation by the International Slavery Museum found “no historical evidence” to support a connection.

== International Slavery Museum ==
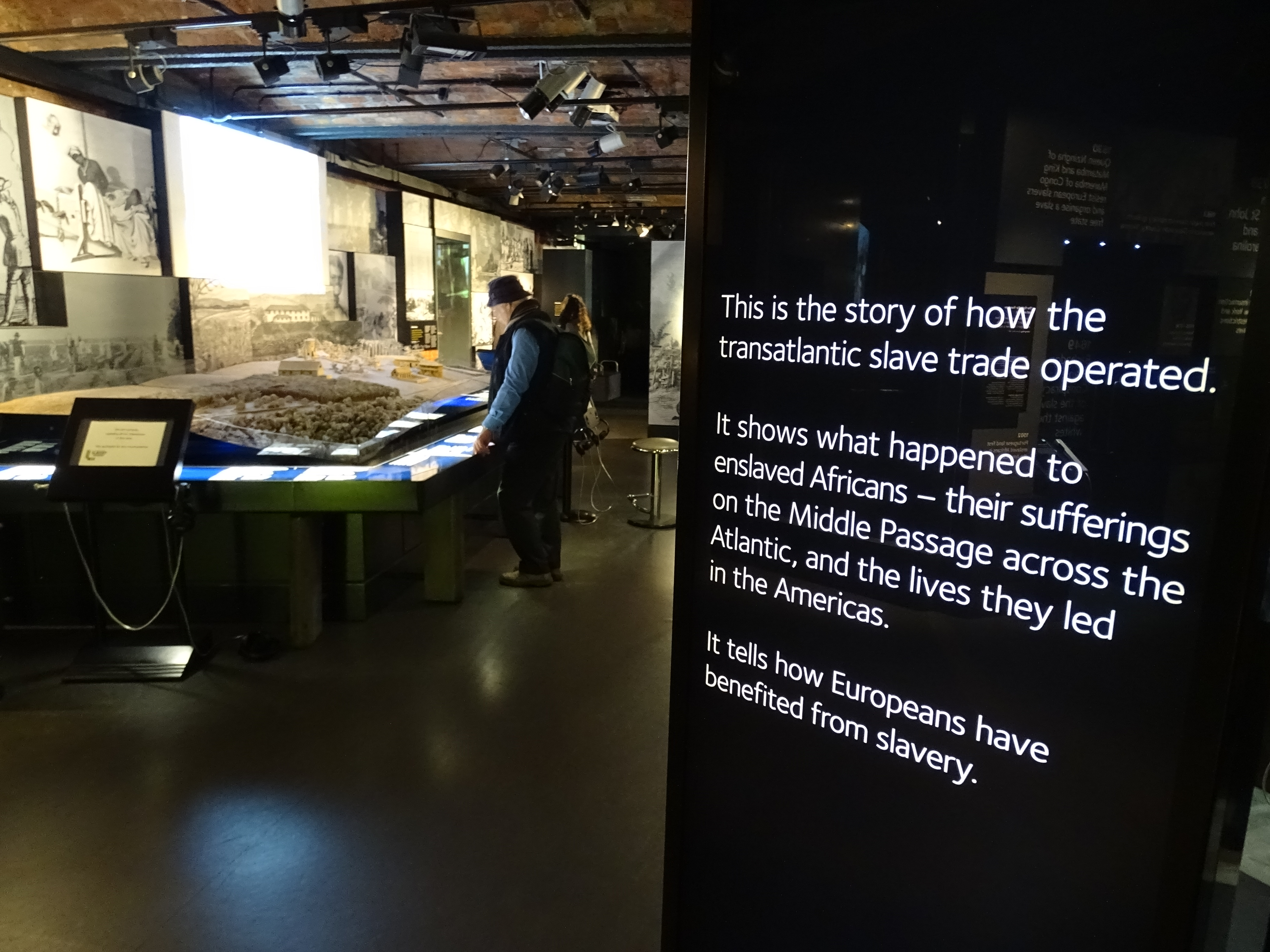
International Slavery Museum of Liverpool

The International Slavery Museum is based at Liverpool docks above the Merseyside Maritime Museum. The museum was founded on August 23, 2007, the bicentenary of the abolition of the slave trade.

== Sources ==
- Richardson, David (2007). Liverpool and Transatlantic Slavery. UK: Liverpool University Press. ISBN 978-1-84631-066-9.

== See also ==
- Atlantic slave trade
- International Slavery Museum
