= John Bolton (merchant) =

English merchant and slave trader (1756–1837)

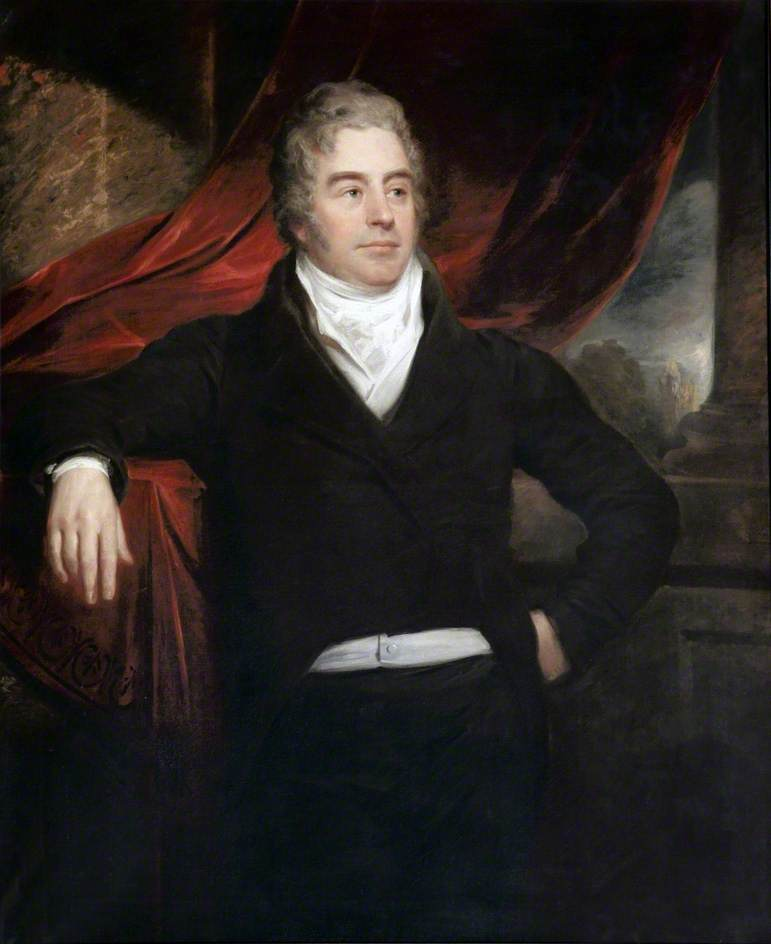
A portrait of Bolton made c. 1808

Lieutenant-Colonel John Bolton (22 March 1756 – 24 February 1837) was an English merchant, Volunteer Corps officer and slave trader. During the Napoleonic Wars, he raised an 800-strong battalion of the Liverpool Volunteers regiment to defend against Napoleon's planned invasion of the United Kingdom.

== Life ==
John Bolton, third and final son of the apothecary Abraham Bolton (died 1764) by his wife, Ann, née Philipson, was born in King Street, Ulverston, Lancashire, on 22 March 1756. The surname was probably originally spelt Boulton.

John was educated at the local grammar school, and apprenticed at Liverpool to the firm of Rawlinsons & Chorley, merchants in the West Indies cotton trade, who sent him to the Caribbean, where he was employed by them, on St. Vincent and later St. Lucia, between 1773 and 1783. He returned to Liverpool a wealthy man in 1784, and undertook a lucrative trade with the Windward Islands in sugar, cotton, coffee, rum and molasses. In 1787 he branched into the African trade, investing in seventy-three slaving voyages between 1787 and 1807, often as the sole investor, in the last years of the British slave trade. These voyages transported approximately 20,000 slaves to the Caribbean.

In February 1798, during the Napoleonic Wars, Bolton gave 500l. for the defence of his country. In 1803 he raised and funded a force of 800 volunteers, the first battalion of the Liverpool Volunteers, which he led as lieutenant-colonel till 1806. In the same year he bought Storrs Hall and 1,000 acres on Lake Windermere, and there received such notable personages as Christopher North, William Wordsworth, Sir Walter Scott, George Canning and William Huskisson.

Bolton also owned property in Demerara, Guiana, St. Vincent and St. Croix. Following the abolition of slavery by the British Parliament in 1833, Bolton, and later his estate, were compensated to the amount of 35,240l. 13s. 7d. for the cost of emancipating 783 enslaved people working land in which Bolton was invested.

Bolton died in Liverpool on 24 February 1837, in his eighty-first year, and was interred in St Martin's Church, Bowness-on-Windermere on 9 March. Against the wall of the south aisle of the church is a white veined marble slab dedicated to Bolton.

== Personal life ==
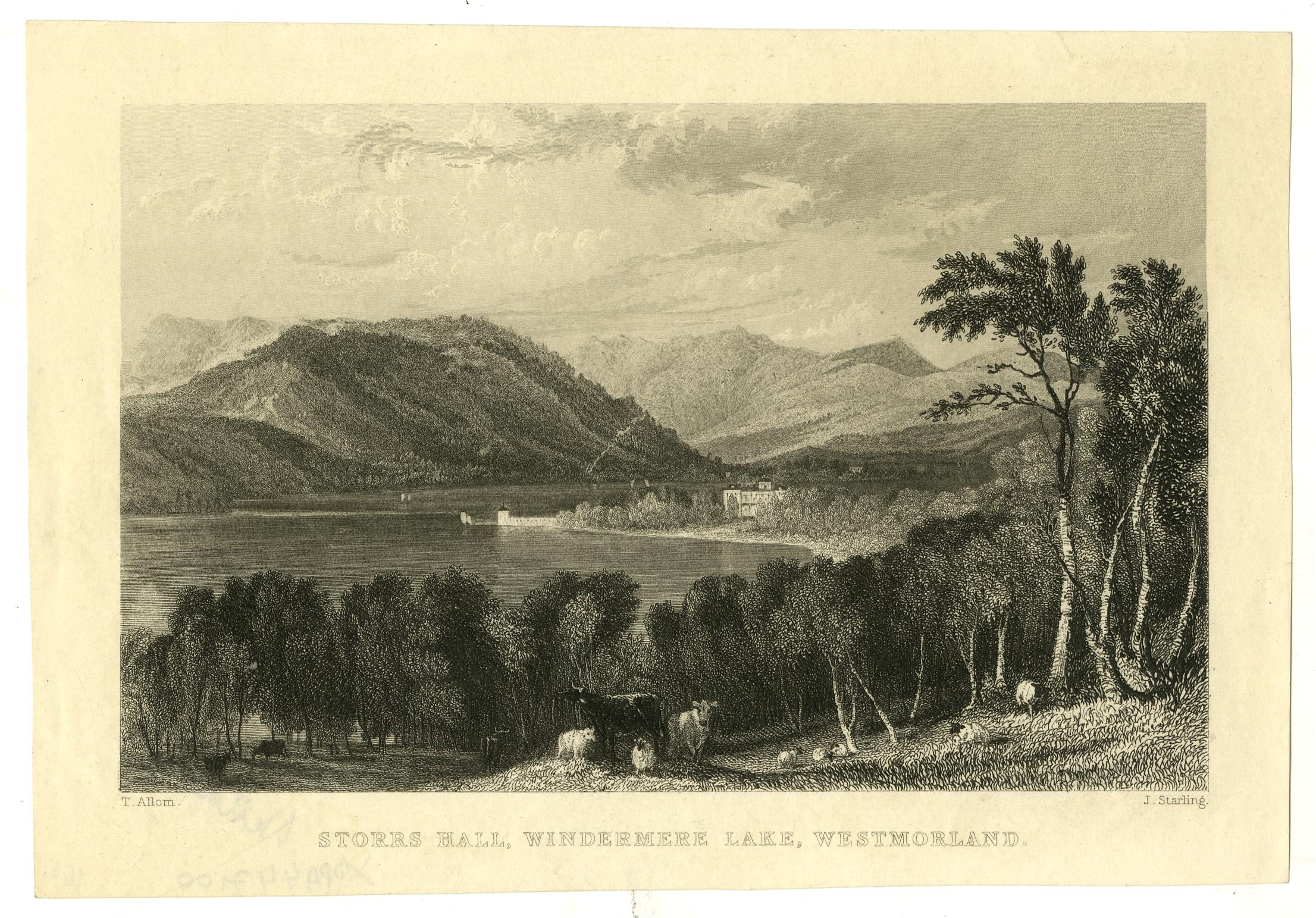
Storrs Hall, Windermere Lake, Westmorland, 1832–1835

Bolton married Elizabeth Littledale (born 1768), daughter of the merchant Henry Littledale, and sister of Bolton's future business partner Anthony Littledale, at St Marylebone Church, London, on 31 May 1797. The marriage was barren. Elizabeth died a widow on 22 September 1848.

== See also ==
- Liverpool slave trade

== Sources ==
- Hyde, Matthew; Pevsner, Nikolaus (2010) [1967], Cumbria: Cumberland, Westmorland and Furness. New Haven and London: Yale University Press, pp. 165–167. ISBN 978-0-300-12663-1.
- Mathews, Godfrey W. (1941). "John Bolton, A Liverpool Merchant, 1756–1837". The Historic Society of Lancashire and Cheshire, 93. pp. 98–115.
- Pope, David (2016). "Bolton, John (1756–1837), West India and South American merchant, slave trader, and slave owner". Oxford Dictionary of National Biography (online ed.). Oxford University Press. doi:10.1093/ref:odnb/107413. (Subscription, Wikipedia Library access or UK public library membership required.)
