= Thomas Staniforth =

Liverpool merchant, slave-trader and local politician

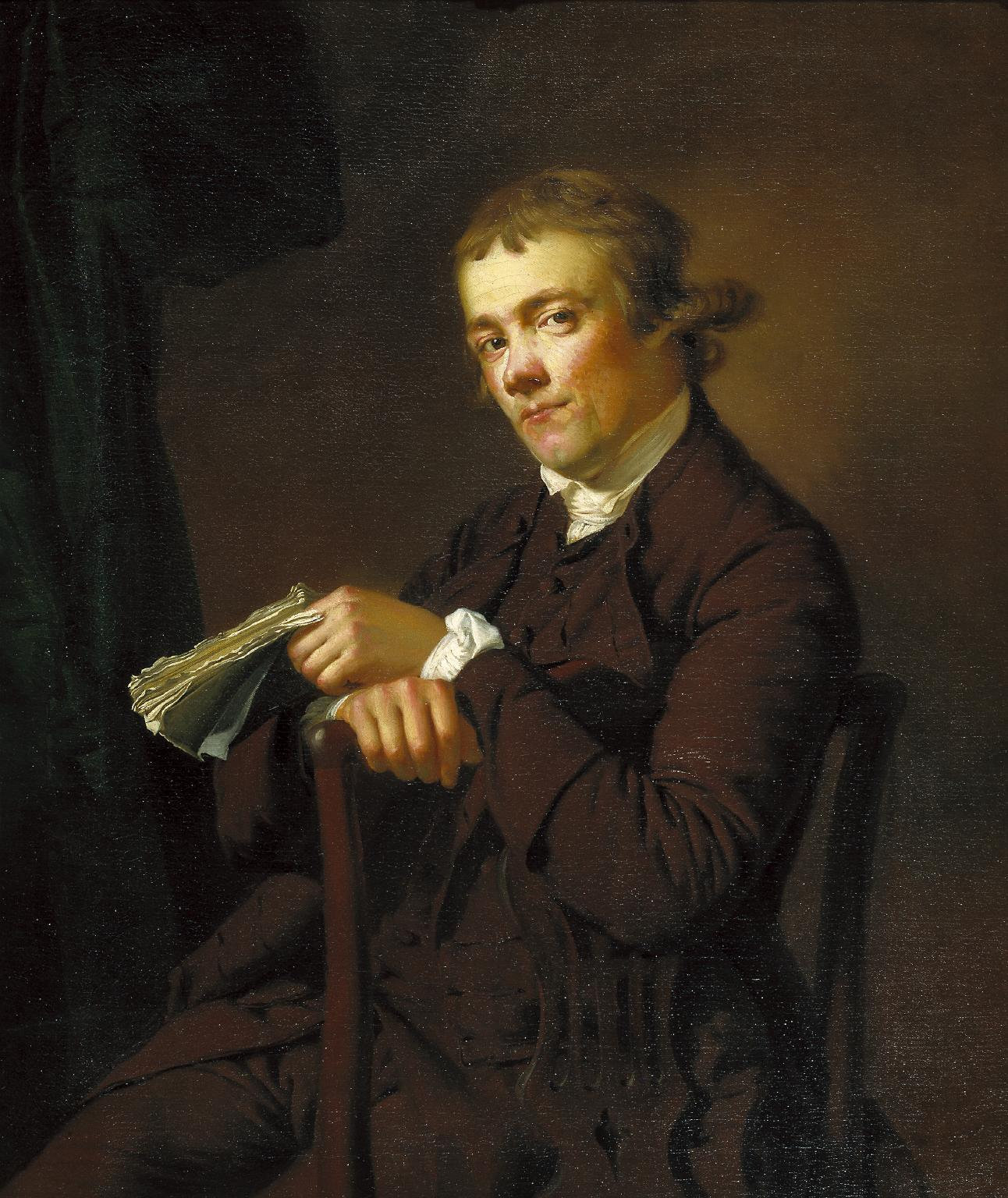
- Thomas Staniforth of Darnall, painted in 1769 by Joseph Wright of Derby
- Born: 1735; Darnall, Sheffield, England
- Died: 15 December 1803 (aged 68); Ranelagh Street, Liverpool, England
- Resting place: St. Thomas, Liverpool
- Occupation: Politician
- Known for: Lord Mayor of Liverpool
- Children: Samuel Staniforth, inter alia
- Parents: Samuel Staniforth Esq.; Alethea Macro

Thomas Staniforth (1735–1803) was an English slave-trader, merchant and politician. He was originally from Sheffield, but spent most of his life in Liverpool.

Staniforth was the son of Samuel Staniforth Esq. and Alethea Macro of Darnall Hall. The family was a prominent family from Darnall, Sheffield but Thomas lived for most of his life in Liverpool, where he took part in the slave trade along with his son Samuel. He was Mayor of Liverpool for 1797–1798.

Records show that both he and his son Samuel Staniforth, a man who would follow in his father's footsteps and become Mayor of Liverpool for 1812–1813, took part in the sale of many African slaves between Europe and the United States.

Thomas married Elizabeth Goore, daughter of Lord Mayor of Liverpool Charles Goore. He was also the grandfather of Anglican priest Thomas Staniforth, the great-grandfather of politician John Greenwood and so the ancestor of English national cricket captain R. T. Stanyforth.
