= Storrs Hall =

Hotel in Cumbria, England

Coordinates: 54.3391°N 2.9357°W

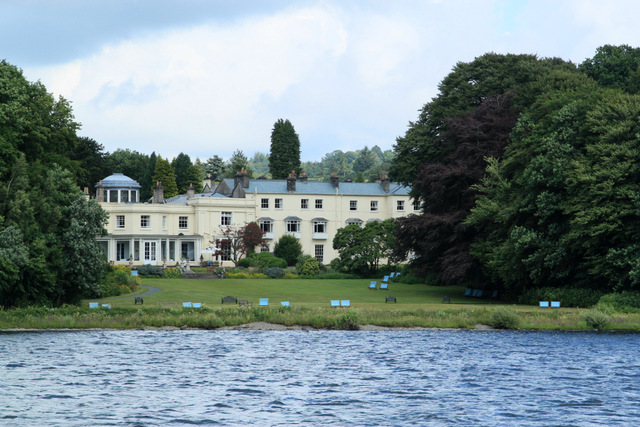
Storrs Hall Hotel

Storrs Hall is a hotel on the banks of Windermere in Storrs in the Lake District, Cumbria, England. The hotel, a Grade II* listed Georgian mansion, is also home to the National Trust-owned folly the "Temple" on the end of a stone jetty on Windermere.

== History ==
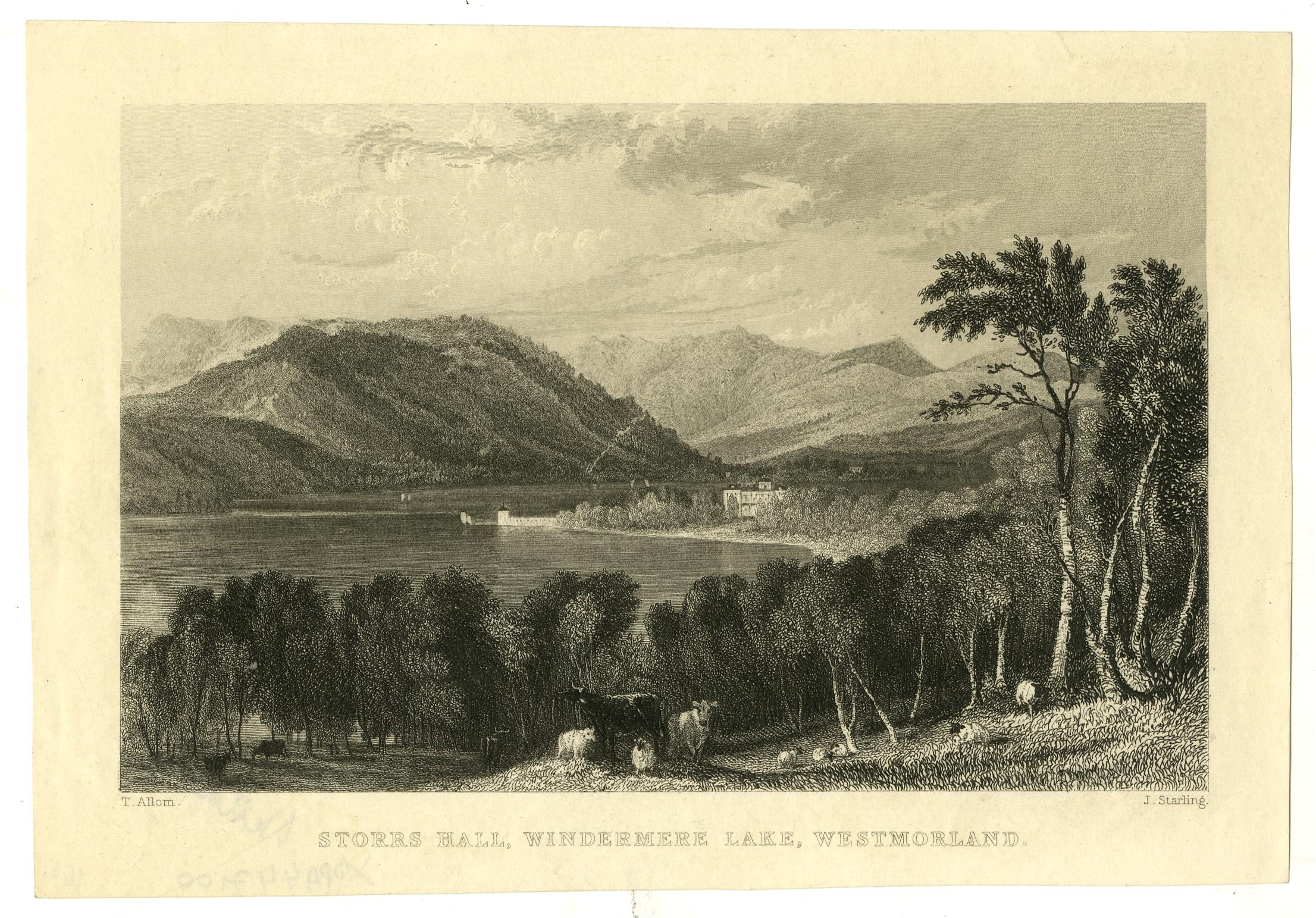
Storrs Hall, Windermere Lake, Westmorland, 1832–1835

The mansion was first built in the 1790s by Sir John Legard, a Yorkshire landowner. After 14 years of owning the building, Sir John Legard became increasingly crippled by gout, and eventually sold Storrs Hall in 1804.

The new owner of Storrs Hall was John Bolton, born in Ulverston, Lancashire in 1756, who was a rich man and one of the wealthiest men of his class. He extended the mansion and created a park. John Bolton was a Lancastrian who made a fortune as a Liverpool slave trader. He bought Storrs Hall with some of the proceeds and used the residence to entertain in style, holding regattas on the lake which were attended by Wordsworth and Sir Walter Scott amongst others.

Elizabeth Bolton died in 1848 and the hall passed to her nephew Reverend Thomas Staniforth. Thomas was the son of former Lord Mayor of Liverpool Samuel Staniforth and grandson of Thomas Staniforth, also former mayor and slave trader. Staniforth moved into the hall in 1859 after retiring from his parish and lived there until he passed in 1887. As he never had any children the estate was sold off in lots.

Between 1940 and 1944, Storrs Hall (which had previously been used both as a girls' school and as a youth hostel) played host to the staff and boys of St Hugh's School, Woodhall Spa, who were evacuated from their own buildings amidst the airfields of Lincolnshire during World War II.

== Today ==
Today, Storrs Hall is a 4 star hotel, and stands on seventeen acres of grounds and woodland.

== In Literature ==
A plate showing the hall appeared in Fisher's Drawing Room Scrap Book, 1832 (Artist, Harwood - Engraved by Tombleson), accompanied by a poetical illustration entitled 'Storrs, Windermere Lake' by Letitia Elizabeth Landon (L. E. L.) to which she adds the following remarks:

The calm and picturesque scenery of the Lake of Windermere might awake a thousand far more romantic visions than that of the return of the first warm feelings of youth. Shut out as it were from the world, and enshrined in delicious seclusion; here might the weary heart dream itself away, and find the freshness of the spring-time of the spirit return upon it. Here, at the mansion of Colonel John Bolton—a circumstance which gives interest to the plate—did the late Mr. Canning retire from the whirl of public affairs; and, to use the words of Fisher's Illustrations of Lancashire, "here was restored, in some measure, the elasticity of a mind, whose lofty energies were ultimately, and for our country we may say prematurely, exhausted in the preservation of a nation's welfare."

== See also ==
- Listed buildings in Windermere, Cumbria (town)
