= Yorkshire Hussars =

Yorkshire Hussars (Alexandra, Princess of Wales's Own)
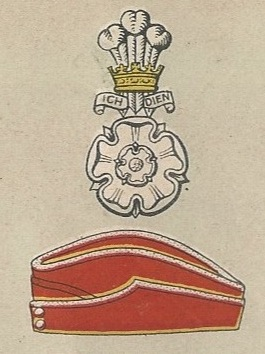
- Badge and service cap as worn at the outbreak of the Second World War
- Active: 13 August 1794 – 1 November 1956
- Country: Kingdom of Great Britain (1794–1800); United Kingdom (1801–1956)
- Branch: Territorial Army
- Type: Yeomanry
- Size: 1–3 Regiments
- Garrison/HQ: York
- Engagements: Second Boer War; First World War Western Front Second World War North African Campaign North West Europe Campaign
- Battle honours: See below

The Yorkshire Hussars (Alexandra, Princess of Wales's Own) was an auxiliary unit of the British Army formed in 1794. The regiment was formed as volunteer cavalry (Yeomanry) in 1794 during the French Revolutionary Wars and served in the Second Boer War and the First World War. It was converted to an armoured role during the Second World War. In 1956, it merged with two other Yorkshire yeomanry regiments to form the Queen's Own Yorkshire Yeomanry. Its lineage is continued today by the Queen's Own Yeomanry.

== French Revolutionary and Napoleonic Wars ==
After Britain was drawn into the French Revolutionary Wars, Prime Minister William Pitt the Younger proposed on 14 March 1794 that the counties should form a force of Volunteer Yeoman Cavalry (Yeomanry) that could be called on by the King to defend the country against invasion or by the Lord Lieutenant to subdue any civil disorder within the county. On 12 June a meeting at Northallerton in the North Riding of Yorkshire resolved to raise Troops of yeomanry. The Lord Lieutenant of Yorkshire, the Duke of Norfolk, proceeded to raise two regiments of West Riding Yeomanry Cavalry on 13 August: the 1st or Southern Corps at Pontefract and the 2nd or Northern Regiment, which included the North Riding Troops. These later became the Yorkshire Dragoons and the Yorkshire Hussars respectively. A local landowner, William Fitzwilliam, 4th Earl Fitzwilliam of Wentworth Woodhouse, was Colonel-Commandant of both corps. Each regiment initially consisted of five Troops of 50 men each, those of the 2nd Corps being the 1st and 2nd Craven (Skipton), Agbrigg and Morley, Barkston Ash and Clare (Knaresborough).

The short-lived Peace of Amiens signed in March 1802 saw most of the Yeomanry disbanded, but on 25 July three troops of the Northern Regiment (at Knaresborough under Captain Robert Harvey, Tadcaster under Lord Hawke, and Aberford under Lieutenant Bainbridge) offered to renew their service. They were joined by four more troops (one of them from Ripon) on 9 October, another (under the command of Lord Grantham) on 18 May 1803, and a ninth (under Capt W.C. Fenton) in December. Robert Harvey became Colonel of the Northern Regiment of West Riding Yeomanry and held the position until 1819.

Although the French invasion threat had dwindled, there was civil unrest and on 5 May 1812 the regiment was ordered to hold itself in readiness to counter the Luddite industrial riots. In 1814 the troops were reorganised to equalise the numbers at 50 men each, with a Sergeant-Major and two trumpeters to each troop. They were now based at: Harewood (2 Trps), Otley, Tadcaster, Selby, Ripon and Knaresborough (2 Trps). Two further troops were raised from Leeds in September 1817 under the command of Capt William Beckett, later MP for Leeds.

== 19th Century ==
The Yeomanry declined in importance and strength after the end of the French wars, but the regiments continued in industrial Yorkshire. The Northern Regiment of West Riding Yeomanry was redesignated the Yorkshire Hussar Regiment of Yeomanry Cavalry on 11 January 1819. Later that year Lord Grantham (who succeeded as the 2nd Earl de Grey in 1833) took over as Commanding Officer (CO) following the death of Col Harvey and held the position for 40 years, apart from 1841 to 1843 when he served as Lord Lieutenant of Ireland and Lt-Col Beckett exercised the command. The regiment was called out in support of the civil power on several occasions, particularly during the riots of 1826 when various troops of the regiment were 'almost incessantly under arms', and the Chartist disturbances of 1842, when they were on duty from 3 June to 31 August around Leeds and Bradford, and Capt York's Troop had to charge the mob at Cleckheaton.

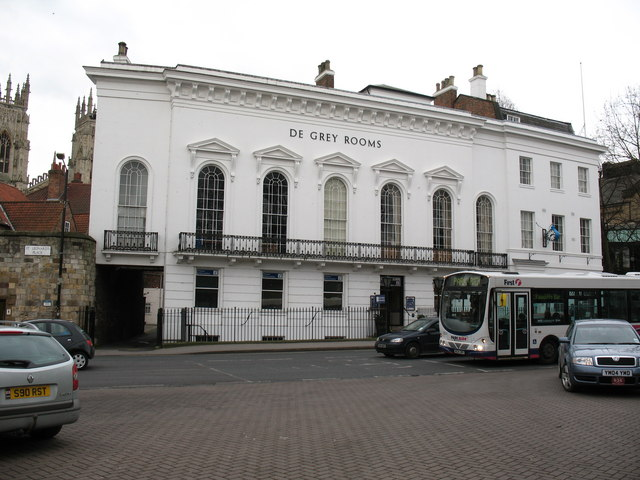
The De Grey Rooms in St Leonard's Street, York, were built in 1841–2 as an officers' mess for the Yorkshire Hussars.

By 1855 the regiment was distributed as follows:

- A Troop at Knaresborough
- B Troop at York
- C & D Troops at Ripon
- E Troop at Harewood
- F Troop at Otley
- G Troop at Aberford
- H Troop at Wheldrake, near York
- I & K Troops at Leeds

On 30 August 1859 Earl De Grey handed over to Henry Lascelles, 4th Earl of Harewood as Lt-Col Commandant and Beilby Lawley, 2nd Baron Wenlock as Lt-Col, who himself took over as Lt-Col Commandant on 23 September 1870. The title Princess of Wales's Own was conferred on the regiment on 1 February 1864.

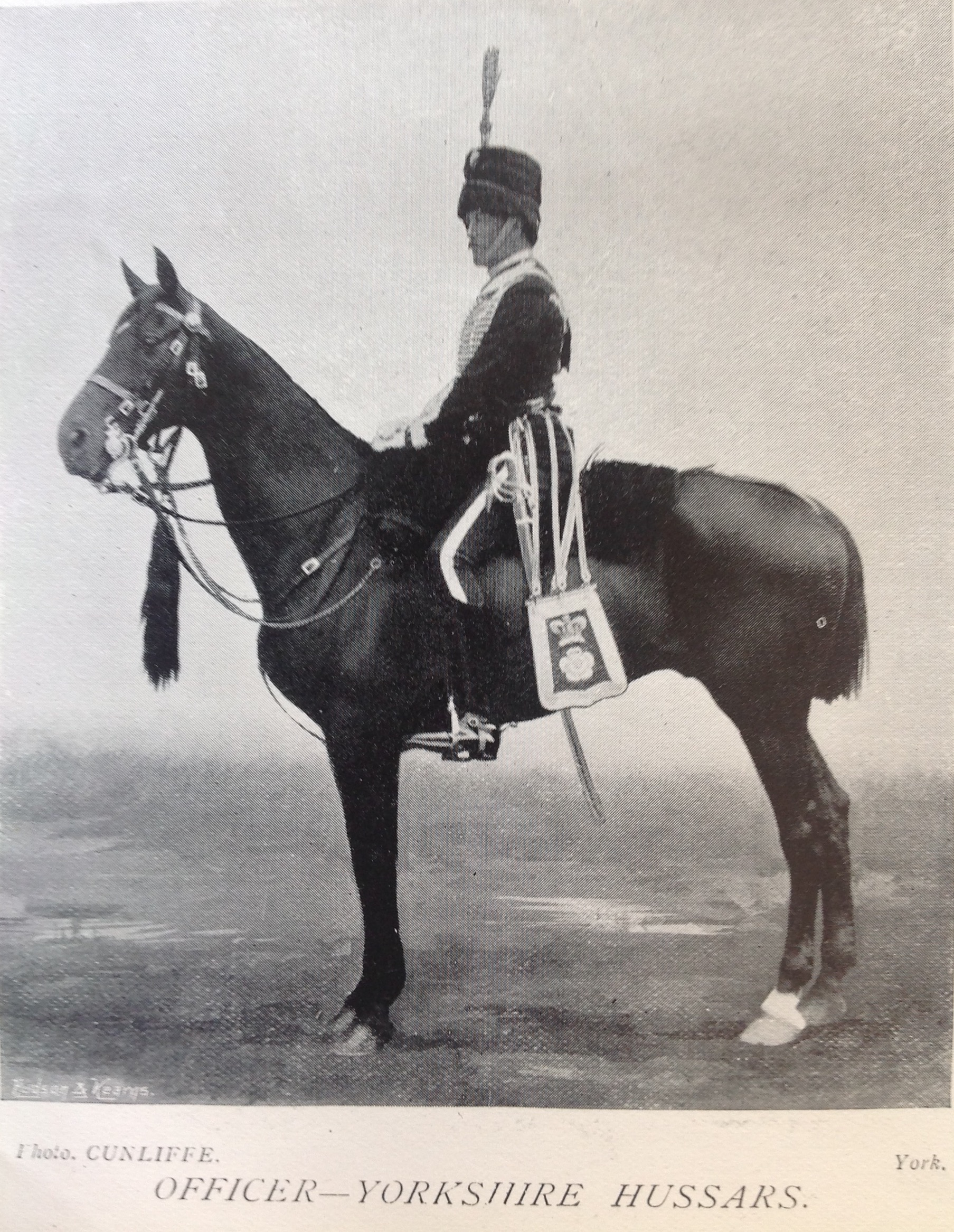
Officer, Yorkshire Hussars, 1896

In 1871 the number of troops was reduced to eight, each with a sergeant-major as permanent staff instructor (PSI), distributed as follows:

- A Trp at Leeds
- B Trp at York
- C & F Trps at Ripon
- D Trp at Selby
- E Trp at Harewood
- G Trp at Aberford
- H Trp at Tadcaster.

1875 saw the first issue of Westley Richards breechloading carbines to the regiment, although there were still only enough to arm half the regiment by 1877.

Following the Cardwell Reforms a mobilisation scheme began to appear in the Army List from December 1875. This assigned Regular and Yeomanry units places in an order of battle of corps, divisions and brigades for the 'Active Army', even though these formations were entirely theoretical, with no staff or services assigned. The Yorkshire Hussars were assigned as 'divisional troops' to 1st Division of VII Corps based at York, alongside Regular units of infantry, artillery and engineers. This scheme was short-lived, but from 1893 the Yorkshire Hussars, Yorkshire Dragoons, and (until its disbandment in 1894) the 2nd West York Yeomanry, were brought together as the 13th Yeomanry Brigade, with its HQ at York. In 1898 the regiment officially became the Yorkshire Hussars (Alexandra, Princess of Wales's Own).

== Imperial Yeomanry ==
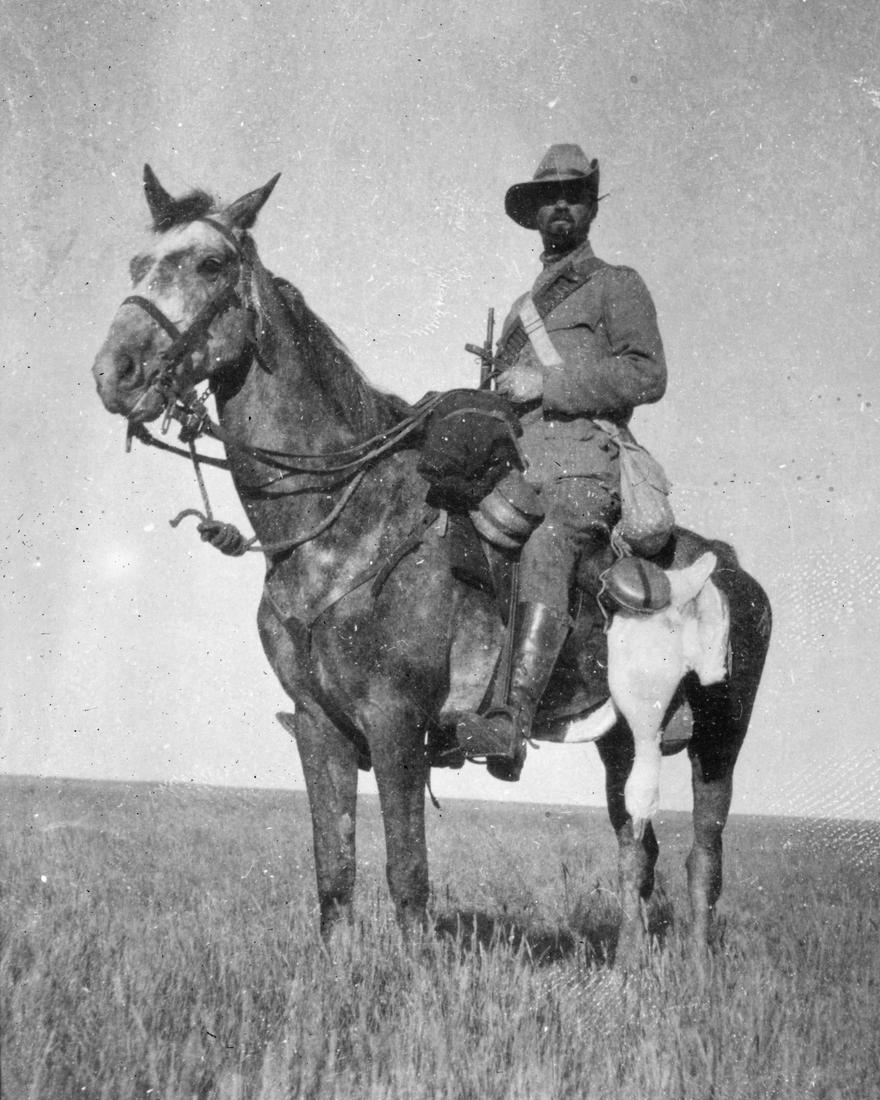
Imperial yeoman on the Veldt.

The Yeomanry was not intended to serve outside the United Kingdom, but following a string of defeats during Black Week in early December 1899, the British government realised that it would need more troops than just the regular army to fight the Second Boer War, particularly mounted troops. On 13 December, the War Office decided to allow volunteer forces to serve in the field, and a Royal Warrant was issued on 24 December that officially created the Imperial Yeomanry (IY). This was organised as county service companies of approximately 115 men enlisted for one year. Existing yeomen and fresh volunteers (mainly middle and upper class) quickly filled the new force, which was equipped to operate as Mounted infantry.

An equipment and emergency fund was set up in the West Riding and by 2 January 1900 13th Yeomanry Brigade had enrolled 330 volunteers at Leeds. The Yorkshire Hussars sponsored the 9th (Yorkshire (Doncaster)) Company and the Yorkshire Dragoons the 11th (Yorkshire Dragoons) Company. Selection and mobilisation began at Sheffield Cavalry Barracks on 6 January and the two companies were complete by 17 January. Along with two companies from Nottinghamshire, the 9th and 11th served in the 3rd Battalion, IY, which was placed under the command of Temporary Lt-Col George Younghusband from the Indian Army.

The Yorkshire Hussars, together with the Yorkshire Dragoons, also raised 66th (Yorkshire) Company in 16th Battalion, and in 1901 it raised 109th (Yorkshire Hussars) Company for the second contingent, and this company also served with 3rd Bn. In 1902, 16th Bn was disbanded and 66th (Yorkshire) Company joined 3rd Bn.

=== Boshof ===
3rd Battalion IY with its horses embarked on Winifredian at Liverpool on 29 January 1900 and was the first IY battalion to arrive in South Africa, disembarking at Cape Town on 20 February 1900. It was attached to 1st Division under the command of Lord Methuen. On 5 April Methuen learned of the presence of a small Boer Commando led by the French Comte de Villebois-Mareuil and ordered the IY and other mounted troops to saddle up at once. The force caught the commando, pinned it with a few rounds of artillery fire, and then advanced by short rushes. The Yorkshire contingent went round the left flank while the Kimberly Mounted Volunteers went round the right, taking advantage of the natural cover. The whole force then closed in and stormed the hill. De Villebois-Mareuil was killed and his men surrendered. The Battle of Boshof was the first action for the new IY, but with little field training, only a brief musketry course, and few officers, they 'acted like veteran troops'. Methuen was 'much struck by the intelligent manner in which they carried out the attack and made use of cover'.

Methuen's Column quickly became known as the 'Mobile Marvels'. On 14 May Methuen marched on Hoopstad and then continued into Orange Free State protecting the flank of Lord Roberts' main army. Methuen's column reached Bothaville on 24 May, but Roberts became concerned about his communications, so Methuen was switched to protecting the rear, and marched to Kroonstad, where his force arrived on 28 May, having completed a march of 168 miles (270 km) in 15 days over poor roads. On 30 May, Methuen was informed that the 13th (Irish) Bn IY was cut off at Lindley, and he rode with his own IY battalions to relieve them, covering 44 miles (71 km) in 24 hours. The mounted column had a five-hour fight to force its way past 3000 Boers led by Christiaan de Wet. Most of the force in Lindley had already surrendered, but Younghusband was able to free a number of the prisoners. Methuen then pushed on to relieve 9th Division, which was besieged at Heilbron, completing a march of 267 miles (430 km) in under a month.

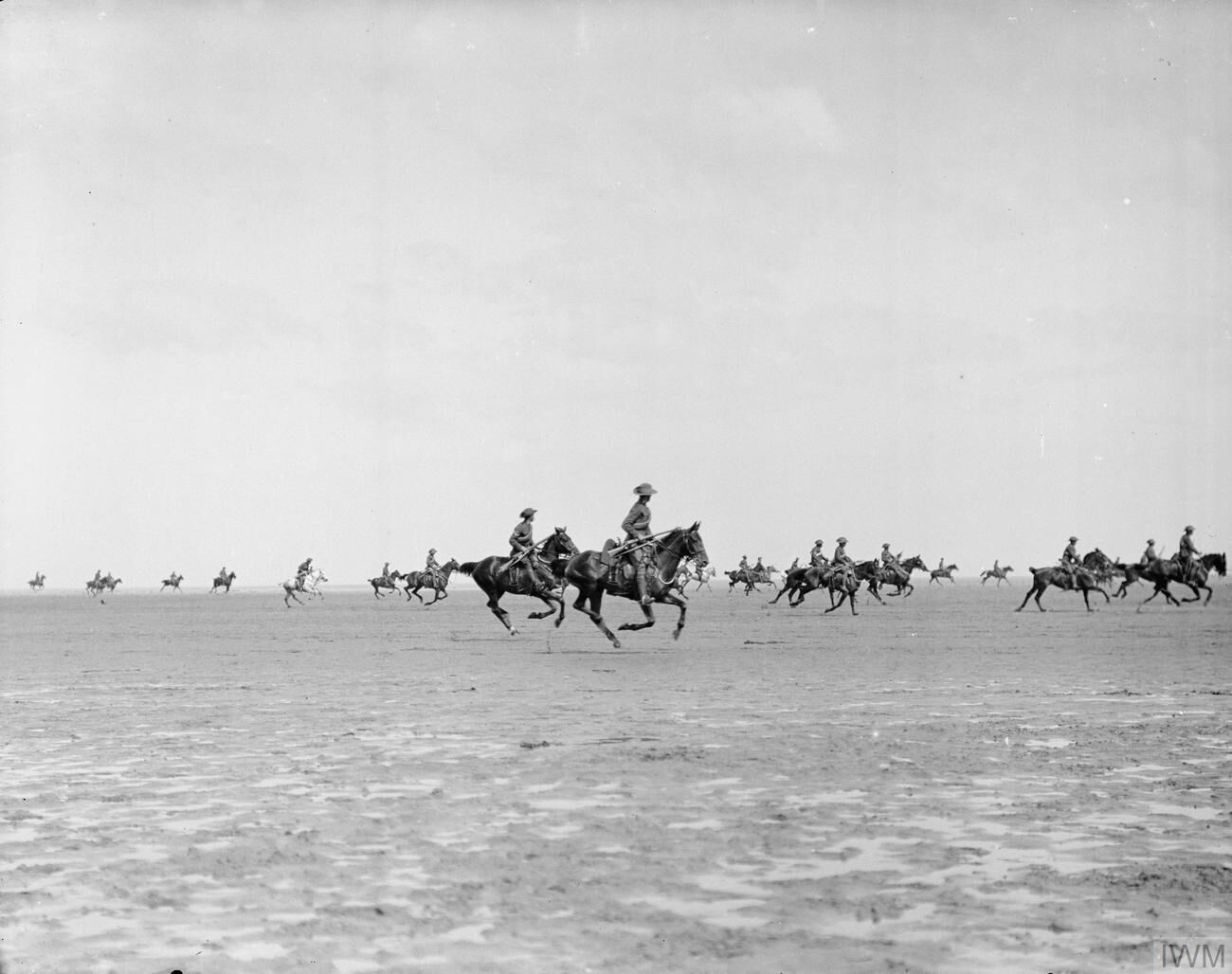
Imperial Yeomanry galloping over a plain during the Second Boer War.

=== Guerrilla warfare ===
Methuen's Column now took part in the pursuit of de Wet's force south down the railway towards Kroonstad, beginning with a sharp action at Renoster River on 24 June. The 'Great de Wet Hunt' began in earnest in August, with Methuen personally leading a column including the 1st Yeomanry Brigade. Methuen drove his force on with little rest, to Welverdiend Pass and Taaibosch Spruit, then to Frederikstad. On 12 August the column engaged the Boers at Mooi River Bridge for four hours, capturing guns and wagons and freeing British prisoners. Methuen's column had covered 150 miles (240 km) in six days, driving de Wet towards the Olifant's Nek pass, which Methuen believed was blocked by other columns. On the night of 13/14 August his troops set out to catch the Boers, engaging them at Buffelshoek about 6 miles (9.7 km) from the pass. However, the Boers escaped through the pass, which had not been blocked. With his troops exhausted, Methuen had to call off the pursuit.

Drives to catch the remaining commandos went on for almost another two years. The First Contingent of the Imperial Yeomanry completed their year's term of service in 1901. Between 24 March 1900 and 4 April 1901 the 3rd Battalion marched 3,171 miles (5,103 km) and was in action 39 times, suffering 109 casualties out of a strength of 500 men. The 66th Company in 16th Bn was in 16 major actions.

Many of the Yeomanry went home after their year's service and were replaced by a Second Contingent, including the 109th (Yorkshire Hussars) Company, which joined the 3rd Bn, while others stayed on during the gruelling last year of the war. The war ended on 31 May 1902 with the Treaty of Vereeniging. The service of its IY companies earned the Yorkshire Hussars its first Battle honour: South Africa 1900–02.

The Imperial Yeomanry had been trained and equipped as mounted infantry. The concept was considered a success and before the war ended the existing Yeomanry regiments at home were converted into Imperial Yeomanry, with an establishment of HQ and four squadrons with a machine gun section. This included the Yorkshire Hussars (Alexandra, Princess of Wales's Own) Imperial Yeomanry, as the regiment was retitled on 23 March 1903.

== Territorial Force ==
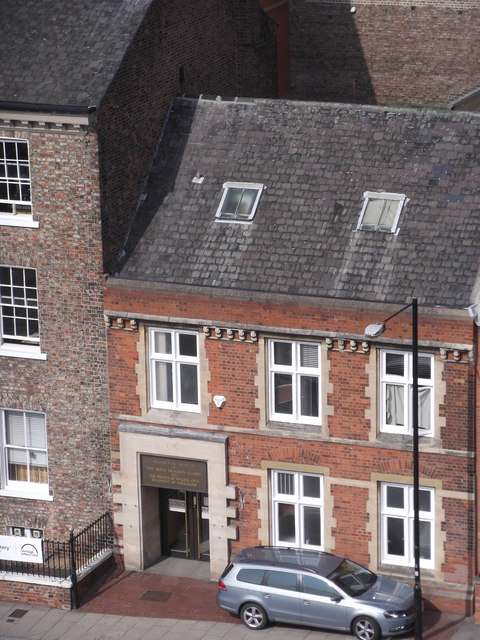
The Yorkshire Hussars' RHQ at Tower Street, York, today the Royal Dragoon Guards Museum.

The Imperial Yeomanry were subsumed into the new Territorial Force (TF) under the Haldane Reforms of 1908. The regiment became the Yorkshire Hussars Yeomanry (Alexandra, Princess of Wales's Own) with the following organisation:

- Regimental Headquarters (RHQ) at 3 Tower Street, York
- A Squadron at 73 Belle Vue Road, Leeds, with a detachment at East Parade, Ilkley
- B Squadron at Bedern, York, with detachments at 4 Bridge Street, Bedale, Drill Hall, Castle Street, Thirsk, Helmsley and Old Maltongate, Malton
- C Squadron at Drill Hall, Park Place, Knaresborough, with detachments at Drill Hall, Strawberry Dale, Commercial Street, Harrogate, Bradford, Easingwold and Ripon
- D Squadron at Grove Hill Road, Middlesbrough, with a detachment at North Street, Scarborough

The regiment formed part of the TF's Yorkshire Mounted Brigade, along with the Queen's Own Yorkshire Dragoons and the East Riding of Yorkshire Yeomanry.

== First World War ==
=== Mobilisation ===
After war was declared on 4 August 1914 the regiment mobilised under the command of Lt-Col Stanyforth at Tower Road and at the drill stations. It then went to its war stations with the Yorkshire Mounted Brigade, guarding the East Yorkshire coast. D Squadron was split up among the other three squadrons.

In accordance with the Territorial and Reserve Forces Act 1907 (7 Edw. 7, c.9) which brought the Territorial Force into being, the TF was intended to be a home defence force for service during wartime and members could not be compelled to serve outside the United Kingdom. However, after the outbreak of war, TF units were invited to volunteer for Overseas Service. On 15 August 1914, the War Office issued instructions to separate those men who had signed up for Home Service only, and form these into reserve units. On 31 August, the formation of a reserve or 2nd Line unit was authorised for each 1st Line unit where 60 per cent or more of the men had volunteered for Overseas Service. The titles of these 2nd Line units would be the same as the original, but distinguished by a '2/' prefix. In this way duplicate battalions, brigades and divisions were created, mirroring those TF formations being sent overseas, and absorbing the flood of volunteers coming in to the recruiting stations. Eventually 3rd Line training units were also formed.

=== 1/1st Yorkshire Hussars ===
Major Viscount Helmsley (Earl of Feversham from 1915), officer commanding B Sqn, took command of the 1st Line of the Yorkshire Hussars with 1st Yorkshire Mounted Brigade, spending the winter of 1914–15 around Harlow in Essex. However, the brigade never operated as such; instead it was broken up in early 1915 to provide divisional cavalry squadrons for the TF and New Army infantry divisions preparing to go overseas.

- The first to leave was B Squadron, under Maj W.G. Eley, which joined 46th (North Midland) Division at Luton and disembarked at Le Havre on 28 February. The division was heavily engaged at the Hohenzollern Redoubt in October. In December it was sent by rail to Marseille to embark for Egypt, but the orders were cancelled and they returned to the trenches of the Western Front in February 1916.
- A Squadron under Maj G.R. Lane-Fox was at Harlow on 4 April 1915 when it was ordered to join 50th (Northumbrian) Division. It disembarked at Le Havre on 18 April and the division concentrated at Steenvoorde on 23 April, going into action the very next day in the Second Battle of Ypres. The squadron fought dismounted in the Menin Road sector, 22–25 May (the Battle of Bellewaarde Ridge), suffering a number of casualties, including Maj Lane-Fox wounded. The next few months were spent in the Bailleul–Hazebrouck sector on working parties and mounted police duties.
- C Squadron under Maj E. York disembarked at Le Havre on 14 April 1915 and joined 49th (West Riding) Division as it was concentrating behind the River Lys. The division played a peripheral role in the Battle of Aubers Ridge (9 May), but otherwise it spent the following months holding the line.
- The machine gun section under Lt T. Preston was sent to reinforce the Essex Yeomanry, serving in the Battle of Loos in September 1915. When the Machine Gun Corps was formed the YH section became part of 8th Machine Gun Squadron in 3rd Cavalry Division on 29 February 1916. They were in the Thiepval trenches in August 1916 during the Battle of the Somme and took a prominent part in the Battle of Arras in April 1917. They sustained casualties during the cavalry operations in spring and autumn 1918, and were the only part of the Yorkshire Hussars to remain mounted throughout the war.

After the regiment was split up, Lt-Col Lord Feversham returned to Northern England to raise and command the 21st (Service) Battalion, King's Royal Rifle Corps (Yeoman Rifles). He was killed in action leading it at the Battle of Flers-Courcelette on 15 September 1916.

The three squadrons were reunited between 5 and 10 May 1916 when the regiment became Corps Cavalry to XVII Corps at Gouy-en-Ternois in the Arras sector, during the final stages of the Arras Offensive. On 1 June Lt-Col W. Pepys of the 13th Hussars arrived as CO, succeeded in November when Maj Eley was promoted to the command.

=== 9th (Yorkshire Hussars Yeomanry) West Yorkshire Regiment ===
1/1st Yorkshire Hussars left XVII Corps on 26 August 1917. It was dismounted and sent to No 1 Training Camp at Étaples to re-train as infantry. On 13 November 1917 the regiment was drafted into 9th Battalion Prince of Wales's Own (West Yorkshire Regiment). The 9th West Yorks was a 'Kitchener's Army' battalion recruited from York and serving in the 11th (Northern) Division. It had seen heavy action at Gallipoli and on the Western Front, where it had just come out of the bloodbath of the Third Battle of Ypres. The depleted battalion absorbed all 400 men of 1/1st Yorkshire Hussars and was redesignated 9th (Yorkshire Hussars Yeomanry) Bn. They retained their Yeomanry cap badges but wore West Yorks collar badges. The combined battalion was commanded by Lt-Col F.P. Worsley, DSO, of the West Yorks. The reconstituted battalion's first action was a successful 250-strong raid on the Norman Brickstacks near Lens on 10 November, led by Capt Roger Walker of the Hussars, with each 50-man party led by a Yeomanry officer. The battalion then settled down to a winter of trench-holding, gas shelling and raiding.

The shattered 11th Division was not directly involved in the German spring offensive of 1918, and so was fairly recovered and fresh for the Allied Hundred Days Offensive that began in August. It took a peripheral part in the Second Battle of Arras (the Battles of the Scarpe on 30 August and of Drocourt-Quéant on 2–3 September). It then took a more active role in the battles of the Hindenburg Line, beginning with the Canal du Nord (27 September–1 October).

32nd Brigade, including 9th (YHY) Bn, now commanded by Maj R.E.M. Cherry, MC, launched the division's attack on the opening day of the Canal du Nord battle. It cleared the enemy from the canal banks behind a barrage fired at 08.40, and crossed the canal between 12.00 and 13.15. The division then fanned out, led by 32nd Bde, to reach a line almost at right angles to its original front. In spite of opposition from machine guns in a factory, the brigade had captured its objective, the village of Épinoy, by 18.15 and established a line beyond it. The brigade attacked again on 1 October but got held up by barbed wire, leaving a gap in the division's line. After the main battle had ended, a company of 9th (YHY) Bn participated in a successful midnight attack behind a barrage on 2/3 October to fill this gap. A full-scale attack was then planned to clear the enemy from the banks of the Sensée Canal, but the Germans evacuated their positions at Aubencheul-au-Bac and withdrew across the canal on the night of 6/7 October.

During the subsequent Battle of Cambrai and pursuit to the River Selle, the division was warned to advance on the morning of 9 October, but 32nd Bde had been in reserve 10 miles (16 km) back and did not get into position until after dark. Nevertheless, its patrols found the objective evacuated and occupied it that night. It cleared the Scheldt canal on 11 October.

After a short rest the battalion, now led by Capt R.H. Waddy, joined the final advance. It went forward on 2 November, meeting no opposition, and it was not until the following evening that they re-established contact with the enemy lining the high ground beyond the Aunelle. The battalion dug in just beyond the Jenlain-Curgies railway line. An attack was launched the following morning once the artillery had come up, but the enemy slipped off before the barrage, and the battalion crossed the Aunelle and met no opposition until it pushed on to Roisin. With its flank in the air it was forced to retire to a sunken road, but suffered heavily under shellfire. Roisin cost the battalion five officers and 12 other ranks killed, two officers and 57 ORs wounded and a further 44 missing. It lost another 43 casualties the following day when the Germans shelled Roison.

11th Division attacked again at 05.30 on 6 November, 32nd Bde leading, but artillery ammunition was short because of the extended supply lines and little progress was made. The following morning the advance behind a heavy barrage was rapid and the troops crossed the Grande Honnelle along the whole front. 32nd Brigade continued its advance against slight opposition on 8 November, and at the end of a day's march, the troops received food supplies dropped by aircraft. The advance halted in front of a strongly-held belt of woods. By 11.00 on 11 November, when the Armistice with Germany came into force, the 11th (Northern) Division had been relieved and established itself on the high ground.

In late November 1918 the division pulled back across the Scheldt and the battalion went into billets at Wallers, near Valenciennes, where it spent the winter. Demobilisation began in 1919 and the division dwindled until June, when the final cadres returned to England. The last cadre of 9th (YHY) Battalion was demobilised at home in 1920.

Apart from the theatre honour France and Flanders 1915–1918, 9th (Yorkshire Hussars Yeomanry) Bn was responsible for all of the Yorkshire Hussars' battle honours awarded for the First World War.

=== 2/1st Yorkshire Hussars ===
The 2nd Line regiment was formed in 1914. In 1915 it was under the command of the 2/1st Yorkshire Mounted Brigade in Yorkshire (along with the 2/1st Queen's Own Yorkshire Dragoons and the 2/1st East Riding of Yorkshire Yeomanry) and by March 1916 was in the Beverley area. On 31 March 1916, the remaining Mounted Brigades were numbered in a single sequence and the brigade became 18th Mounted Brigade, still in Yorkshire under Northern Command.

In July 1916 there was a major reorganisation of 2nd Line yeomanry units in the UK. All but 12 regiments were converted to cyclists and, as a consequence, the regiment was dismounted and the brigade converted to 11th Cyclist Brigade. Further reorganisation in October and November 1916 saw the brigade redesignated as 7th Cyclist Brigade in November, now in the Bridlington area. In March 1917, the regiment moved to Driffield and in July to Barmston. It returned to Bridlington in January 1918.

About May 1918, the Brigade moved to Ireland and the regiment was stationed at Fermoy, County Cork and Fethard, County Tipperary. There were no further changes before the end of the war. The regiment was finally disbanded on 12 December 1919 at Fermoy, with the remaining personnel being transferred to 6th Division.

=== 3/1st Yorkshire Hussars ===
A 3rd Line regiment was formed in 1915 and in the summer it was affiliated to 5th Reserve Cavalry Regiment at York. Early in 1917 it was absorbed into the 5th Reserve Cavalry Regiment at Tidworth. In 1918 it was removed from the 5th Reserve Cavalry Regiment, as its 1st Line was serving as infantry, and joined the 5th (Reserve) Battalion of the West Yorkshire Regiment at Rugeley, Cannock Chase.

== Interwar years ==
The regiment was reconstituted as horsed cavalry once more on 7 February 1920. Postwar, a commission was set up to consider the shape of the Territorial Force (Territorial Army from 1 October 1921). The experience of the First World War made it clear that there was a surfeit of cavalry. The commission decided that only the 14 most senior Yeomanry regiments were to be retained as cavalry; the others would be converted to armoured cars, artillery or signals. As the 3rd most senior regiment in the Yeomanry order of precedence, the Yorkshire Hussars retained its horses as mounted cavalry.

== Second World War ==
The regiment was still at 3 Tower Street, York, under the command of Lord Grimthorpe, when it was embodied for service in September 1939. It mobilised as part of 5th Cavalry Brigade with the Yorkshire Dragoons and Sherwood Rangers Yeomanry under the command of the Hussars' former CO, Brigadier T. Preston, but the squadrons initially remained at their HQ towns in case they were needed to keep order in the event of German bombing raids. Later the brigade concentrated at Malton, moving to Market Rasen in Lincolnshire when 1st Cavalry Division was formed on 31 October. It left the UK on 18 January 1940 and travelled through France to embark at Marseille for Palestine.

The regiment became mechanised cavalry in October 1940 and transferred to the 6th Cavalry Bde on 2 March 1941. It transferred to the Royal Armoured Corps (RAC) on 12 April 1941 in preparation for becoming an armoured regiment. The 6th Cavalry Brigade converted into 8th Armoured Bde on 1 August 1941 but the Yorkshire Hussars did not transfer with it, instead joining 9th Armoured Brigade on 10 October 1941 when that formation arrived in Palestine from Iraq. It remained with this brigade in 10th Armoured Division (formerly 1st Cavalry Division) until 13 March 1942, training on M3 Stuart tanks.

In March 1942, the regiment was in Cyprus, armed with Valentine tanks and old Cruiser A13 tanks as the 'Armoured Striking Force' under the fictional '7th Division'. It was variously under Middle East Forces (MEF) and Ninth Army It was shipped back to Egypt in March 1943, training on Crusader and Sherman tanks, familiarising themselves with the 75 mm gun and tactics for the North African Campaign. However, the campaign ended with the fall of Tunis in May 1943 and the regiment remained under MEF for the next few months.

In November 1943 the regiment embarked at Alexandria for the UK, arriving at Gourock on 12 December. The regiment was converted to the infantry reconnaissance role, equipped with Humber Armoured Cars, Humber Light Reconnaissance Cars, Universal Carriers, and riflemen in M3 half-tracks. It joined 50th (Northumbrian) Infantry Division as its reconnaissance unit, but on 24 January 1944 it changed places with 61st Reconnaissance Regiment and joined 61st Infantry Division. 61st Division was a reserve formation and remained in the UK for the whole of the war. Apart from A Sqn, which remained in an operational role, the regiment was split into squadrons from April to August 1944 to run embarkation camps in Sussex for the formations participating in the D Day landings and Normandy Campaign. In August the regiment was reunited and became a Reinforcement Holding Unit for refresher training and drafting of wounded Recce troops returning to North West Europe.

On 16 June, after the end of the war in Europe, the Yorkshire Hussars reverted to an armoured role with Churchill tanks in 35th Tank Brigade (which was in the process of converting into a new 35th Armoured Brigade), which was a training formation supplying reinforcements to 21st Army Group in North West Europe. It was placed in 'suspended animation' in March 1946.

== Postwar ==
When the TA was reconstituted in 1947, the Yorkshire Hussars reformed as an armoured regiment in the Royal Armoured Corps, with the following distribution:

- RHQ at York
- A Sqn at Leeds
- B Sqn at York
- C Sqn at Middlesbrough

Together with the Yorkshire Dragoons, the East Riding Yeomanry and 45th/51st (Leeds Rifles) Royal Tank Regiment, it constituted the 8th (Yorkshire) Armoured Brigade in 49th (West Riding and North Midland) Armoured Division. On 1 November 1956, the Yorkshire Hussars, Yorkshire Dragoons and East Riding Yeomanry were amalgamated into The Queen's Own Yorkshire Yeomanry. On 1 April 1967, the regiment was disbanded and concurrently reconstituted as a TAVR III infantry unit with the RHQ and 'A' Squadron at York, 'B' Squadron at Doncaster and 'C' Squadron at Hull. On 1 April 1969, the regiment was reduced to a cadre and then reformed on 1 April 1971, as 'Y' Squadron, (re-designated in 2014 as 'A' Squadron) The Queen's Own Yeomanry.

== Uniforms and insignia ==
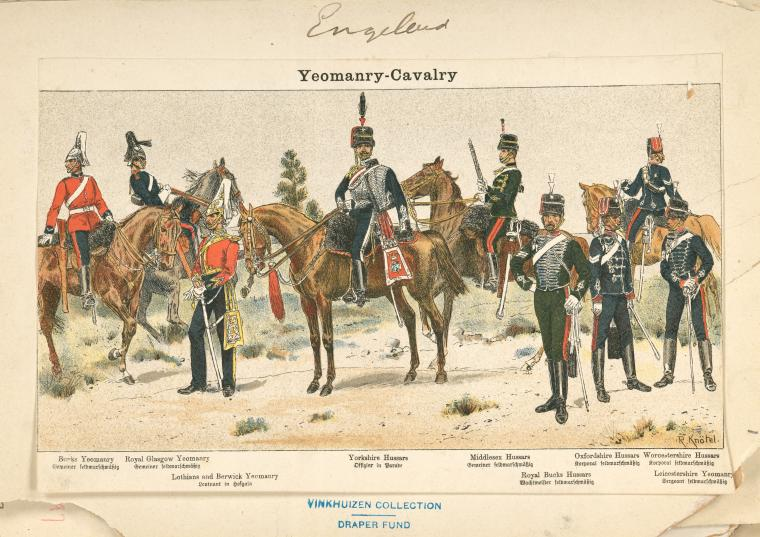
The Yorkshire Hussars' full dress shown in the centre of Richard Knötel's 1899 painting of Yeomanry uniforms.

The uniform of both the Southern and Northern West Riding Yeomanry in 1794 was a long-skirted scarlet coat with green collar and cuffs, and silver fringed epaulettes for officers; white breeches and black boots; white belts and gloves. The trumpeters were mounted on grey horses from October 1794. The original headgear was a 'round hat' (a low top hat) with a fore-and-aft bearskin crest over the crown. The original uniforms were such poor quality that they were replaced the following year, when new pattern 'Tarleton' light cavalry helmets were issued with 'Y.W.R.C' on the front band and probably a buff 'turban' (but re-using the same bearskin crest) and the shorter red jackets were given buff silk cord trimmings and white metal shoulder-wings for the men, with silver fringes for the officers. A scarlet waistcoat trimmed in buff was added (from 1797 the trumpeters wore a plain buff waistcoat). Sergeant-Majors (one per Troop, all ex-Regular NCOs) wore four silver chevrons on a green ground, sergeants wore three similar chevrons.

When the Northern troops continued in 1802 they wore the light cavalry helmet with a plain blue unlaced jacket with three rows of buttons down the front, blue breeches with leather at the bottom and inside the legs, black leather sword and pouch belts. However, when the Northern regiment was re-established in 1803 it reverted to a red jacket for full dress (except the farriers who wore blue), with yellow cuffs and collar, edged with white braid and with about 21 rows of braid across the front. Blue breeches continued for marching order until 1805 when they were replaced with white canvas ones. The cloak was blue, lined white. The full dress helmet had a white-over-red plume, blue turban and silver chainwork; the trumpeters and farriers wore tall bearskin caps with plume and a large silver plate. Officers wore plain black leather sabretaches, those of senior officers being scarlet, laced round the edge in silver with a silver White Rose of York in the centre. Blue folding 'watering' or 'fatigue' caps piped in white were issued for undress; these were replaced in 1811 by blue 'Woollen Scotch Bonnets' with white ball tufts and bands. In 1807 it was proposed to alter the uniform to blue to conform with the Regular light dragoons, but this was not carried out.

The regiment was re-clothed in 1817, when the old Tarleton helmet was replaced by a black light dragoon Shako (red for the band and trumpeters) with a white band round the top and a metal White Rose of York badge. The laced red jacket was continued, but with Oxford grey overalls with a single white stripe. Plain black sabretaches were now issued to the men,

After the regiment became Hussars in 1819 it progressively adopted the appropriate uniform style. In 1820 the officers gained red pelisses edged with black fur and with silver lacing; those for the other ranks were made from their old stable jackets. The yellow facings were removed, the shakos re-covered with sky blue cloth and the small white-over-red plume replaced by a black upright horsehair plume. When new clothing was issued in 1824 the shako was covered with black cloth and the black horsehair plume was drooping, the pelisse was now blue and braided like the jacket. Then in 1828 the jacket was also changed to blue, and from 1832 the overalls were dark grey, almost black, with white stripes. New red shakoes were issued in 1840 (blue for the band and trumpeters). Between 1848 and 1852 the full dress for officers and men settled down to dark blue, braided white and in 1856 the shako was replaced by a Hussar Busby: this uniform was worn essentially unchanged for the next 60 years (see 1896 photograph above), although pelisses later became reserved for special occasions and the busby for church parades, scarlet pillbox caps being worn instead. From 1895 Officers wore a plain blue undress coat (see Photo of Lt-Col Stanyforth below) while the men had a blue serge 'frock' jacket. A gold crown above the rose of York had been added to officers' full dress scarlet sabretaches and pouches between 1846 and 1850. When Alexandra, Princess of Wales, gave her name to the regiment in 1863, it adopted as its cap badge the Prince of Wales's feathers over the White Rose of York, which it retained until 1956.

After the regiment became Imperial Yeomanry, the standard IY khaki uniform came into use with red piping down the trousers; it was worn with a Slouch hat carrying a white over red plume. In 1906 the peaked forage cap was adopted, in scarlet with a black peak for officers, khaki for other ranks, although the scarlet pillbox cap continued to be worn for 'walking out'. Forage caps remained scarlet until the Second World War.

== Commanders ==
=== Commanding Officers ===
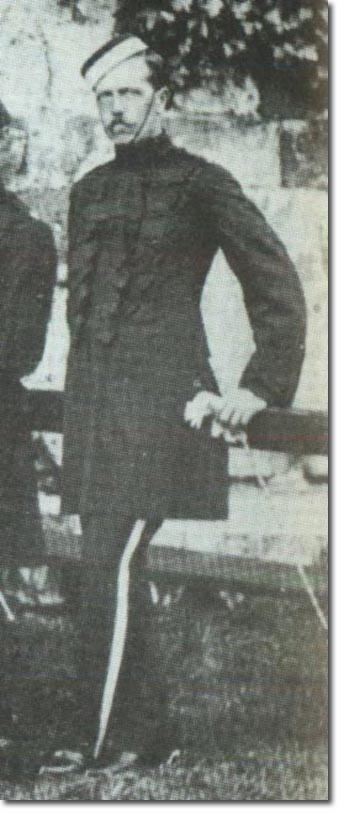
Lt-Col E.W. Stanyforth

The following served as commanding officer (CO) of the unit:

- Col William Fitzwilliam, 4th Earl Fitzwilliam, 1794–1802
- Col Robert Harvey, 1802–1819
- Col Thomas de Grey, 2nd Earl de Grey, 1819–1859
- Lt-Col William Beckett, acting 1841–43
- Lt-Col Henry Lascelles, 4th Earl of Harewood, 1859–1870
- Lt-Col Beilby Lawley, 2nd Lord Wenlock, 1870–1878
- Lt-Col William Harrison-Broadley, MP, 1878–1881
- Lt-Col Henry Lascelles, 5th Earl of Harewood, 1881–1898
- Lt-Col William Orde-Powlett, 4th Lord Bolton, 1898–1903
- Col Frederic Richard Thomas Trench Gascoigne, DSO, 1903–1908
- Lt-Col C.W.E. Duncombe, CBE, TD, 1908–1912
- Lt-Col Robert de Yarburgh-Bateson, 3rd Lord Deramore, 1912–1914
- Lt-Col Edwin Wilfrid Stanyforth, CB, 1914–1920
- Col Sir George Lane-Fox, MP, TD, 1920–1924
- Lt-Col E. York, TD, 1924–1928
- Lt-Col W.G. Charlesworth, 1928–1932
- Lt-Col T. Preston, 1932–1936
- Lt-Col Ralph Beckett, 3rd Lord Grimthorpe, TD, 1936–1940
- Lt-Col J.H. Goodhart, MC, 1940–1941
- Lt-Col J.P. Stanton, 1941–1942
- Lt-Col H.W. Lloyd, 1942–1943
- Lt-Col J.B. Whitehead, MC, TD, 1943–1945
- Lt-Col Francis Lane Fox, 1945–1946

=== Honorary Colonels ===
The following former COs were later appointed Honorary Colonel of the unit:

- William Harrison-Broadley, 5 October 1881
- Henry Lascelles, 5th Earl of Harewood, 15 June 1898
- Wiliam, 4th Lord Bolton, TD, 1 April 1913
- George Lane-Fox, 1st Lord Bingley, TD, 3 May 1924 to 1946

=== Other prominent members ===
- Lt Stephen Frederick Wombwell, son and heir of Sir George Wombwell, 4th Baronet, died of enteric fever at Vryburg while serving as a captain with the Imperial Yeomanry.
- Capt Beilby Lawley, 3rd Baron Wenlock, raised the East Riding of Yorkshire Yeomanry ('Wenlock's Horse') after the Boer War
- Lt Charles Wilson, 2nd Lord Nunburnholme, raised the 'Hull Pals' during the First World War
- Lt-Col Charles Duncombe, 2nd Earl of Feversham, previously (as Viscount Helmsley) CO of 1/1st Yorkshire Hussars, was killed in action on 15 September 1916 at the Battle of Flers-Courcelette while commanding the 21st (Yeoman Rifles) Bn, King's Royal Rifle Corps
- Maj Thomas Dugdale, Scots Greys, was adjutant of the Yorkshire Hussars in the 1930s and the Second World War, and later a prominent MP who became the 1st Lord Crathorne.

== Affiliations ==
From 1908 the regiment was affiliated to the Hussars of the Regular Army. The Yorkshire Squadron, Imperial Cadet Yeomanry, was affiliated to the unit in the years before the First World War.

Between 1947 and 1956 the regiment was affiliated to the 8th King's Royal Irish Hussars of the Regular Army.

== Battle honours ==
The Yorkshire Hussars was awarded the following battle honours (honours in bold are emblazoned on the regimental guidon):

Second Boer War	**South Africa 1900–02**
First World War	**Arras 1918**, **Scarpe 1918**, **Drocourt-Quéant**, **Hindenburg Line**, **Canal du Nord**, **Cambrai 1918**, **Selle**, **Sambre**, **France and Flanders 1915–18**

Strangely, given its overseas service, the regiment was not awarded any battle honours for the Second World War.

== See also ==
- Imperial Yeomanry
- List of Yeomanry Regiments 1908
- Yeomanry
- Yeomanry order of precedence
- British yeomanry during the First World War
- Second line yeomanry regiments of the British Army
- Painting of Col R.T.F. Gascoigne with his horse in South Africa, 1900, Leeds Museums and Art Galleries

== Bibliography ==
- Anon, Regimental Badges and Service Caps, London: George Philip & Sons, 1941.
- Maj A. F. Becke, History of the Great War: Order of Battle of Divisions, Part 1: The Regular British Divisions, London: HM Stationery Office, 1934/Uckfield: Naval & Military Press, 2007, ISBN 1-847347-38-X.
- Maj A. F. Becke, History of the Great War: Order of Battle of Divisions, Part 2a: The Territorial Force Mounted Divisions and the 1st-Line Territorial Force Divisions (42–56), London: HM Stationery Office, 1935/Uckfield: Naval & Military Press, 2007, ISBN 1-847347-39-8.
- Maj A. F. Becke, History of the Great War: Order of Battle of Divisions, Part 2b: The 2nd-Line Territorial Force Divisions (57th–69th), with the Home-Service Divisions (71st–73rd) and 74th and 75th Divisions, London: HM Stationery Office, 1937/Uckfield: Naval & Military Press, 2007, ISBN 1-847347-39-8.
- Maj A. F. Becke, History of the Great War: Order of Battle of Divisions, Part 3a: New Army Divisions (9–26), London: HM Stationery Office, 1938/Uckfield: Naval & Military Press, 2007, ISBN 1-847347-41-X.
- Maj A. F. Becke, History of the Great War: Order of Battle of Divisions, Part 4: The Army Council, GHQs, Armies, and Corps 1914–1918, London: HM Stationery Office, 1944/Uckfield: Naval & Military Press, 2007, ISBN 1-847347-43-6.
- L. Barlow & R. J. Smith, The Uniforms of the British Yeomanry Force 1794–1914, 3: The Yorkshire Hussars, Aldershot: Robert Ogilby Trust/Tunbridge Wells: Midas Books, 1981, ISBN 0-85936-250-7.
- L. Barlow & R. J. Smith, The Uniforms of the British Yeomanry Force 1794–1914, 7: Yorkshire Dragoons, Aldershot: Robert Ogilby Trust/Tunbridge Wells: Spellmount, 1984, ISBN 0-946771-82-0.
- Burke's Peerage, Baronetage and Knightage, 100th Edn, London, 1953.
- Louis Creswicke, South Africa and the Transvaal War, Vol V, From the Disaster at Koorn Spruit to Lord Roberts's Entry into Pretoria.
- Col John K. Dunlop, The Development of the British Army 1899–1914, London: Methuen, 1938.
- Brig-Gen Sir James E. Edmonds, History of the Great War: Military Operations, France and Belgium 1918, Vol IV, 8th August–26th September: The Franco-British Offensive, London: Macmillan, 1939/Uckfield: Imperial War Museum and Naval & Military, 2009, ISBN 978-1-845747-28-2.
- Brig-Gen Sir James E. Edmonds & Lt-Col R. Maxwell-Hyslop, History of the Great War: Military Operations, France and Belgium 1918, Vol V, 26th September–11th November, The Advance to Victory, London: HM Stationery Office, 1947/Imperial War Museum and Battery Press, 1993, ISBN 1-870423-06-2.
- Maj L. F. Ellis, History of the Second World War, United Kingdom Military Series: Victory in the West, Vol I: The Battle of Normandy, London: HM Stationery Office, 1962/Uckfield: Naval & Military, 2004, ISBN 1-845740-58-0.
- J. B. M. Frederick, Lineage Book of British Land Forces 1660–1978, Vol I, Wakefield, Microform Academic, 1984, ISBN 1-85117-007-3.
- Maj-Gen Sir Steuart Hare, The Annals of the King's Royal Rifle Corps, Vol V: The Great War, London:John Murray. 1932/Uckfield: Naval & Military Press, 2015, ISBN 978-1-84342-456-7.
- James, Brig E. A. (1978). British Regiments 1914–18. London: Samson Books. ISBN 0-906304-03-2. Reprinted 2001 ISBN 978-1-84342-197-9.
- Lt-Col H. F. Joslen, Orders of Battle, United Kingdom and Colonial Formations and Units in the Second World War, 1939–1945, London: HM Stationery Office, 1960/London: London Stamp Exchange, 1990, ISBN 0-948130-03-2/Uckfield: Naval & Military Press, 2003, ISBN 1-843424-74-6
- N. B. Leslie, Battle Honours of the British and Indian Armies 1695–1914, London: Leo Cooper, 1970, ISBN 0-85052-004-5.
- Mileham, Patrick (1994). The Yeomanry Regiments; 200 Years of Tradition. Edinburgh: Canongate Academic. ISBN 1-898410-36-4.
- Stephen M. Miller, Lord Methuen and the British Army: Failure and Redemption in South Africa, London: Cass, 1999, ISBN 0-7146-4904-X.
- Rinaldi, Richard A. (2008). Order of Battle of the British Army 1914. Ravi Rikhye. ISBN 978-0-97760728-0.
- Col H. C. B. Rogers, The Mounted Troops of the British Army 1066–1945, London: Seeley Service, 1959.
- Edward M. Spiers, The Army and Society 1815–1914, London: Longmans, 1980, ISBN 0-582-48565-7.
