= Samuel Staniforth =

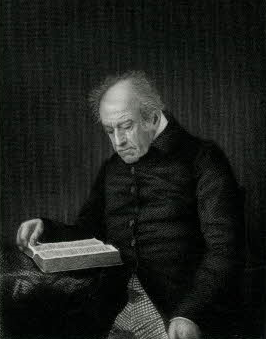
- Samuel Staniforth c1850 Aged 80
- Born: 26 February 1769; Union Street, Liverpool, England
- Died: 5 April 1851 (aged 82); Everton Terrace, Liverpool, England
- Resting place: St. Thomas, Liverpool
- Occupation: Politician
- Known for: Lord Mayor of Liverpool
- Spouse: Mary Littledale (m. 1800; died 1846)
- Children: Sarah Staniforth (1805–1892); Thomas Staniforth (1807–1887)
- Parents: Thomas Staniforth; Elizabeth Goore

Samuel Staniforth (26 February 1769 – 5 April 1851) was an English slave-trader, merchant and politician originally from Liverpool.

Staniforth was the son of Thomas Staniforth and Elizabeth Goore. The family was a prominent family from Darnall, Sheffield but Samuel lived for most of his life in Liverpool, where he took part in the slave trade along with his father Thomas.

He was born on Union Street, Liverpool on 26 February 1769 and was educated at Clitheroe School under Thomas Wilson. On 28 April 1800 he married Mary Littledale at St. Thomas' Church, Liverpool. He was Mayor of Liverpool from 1812 to 1813.

Records show that both Staniforth and his father Thomas, took part in the trading of many African slaves between Europe and the United States.

Samuel had two children, Reverend Thomas Staniforth (1807–1887), who retired to Storrs Hall and died without having children, and Sarah Staniforth, who married magistrate Frederick Greenwood. Sarah and Frederick had a number of children including politician John Greenwood and Sarah Hannah Greenwood who married John Benson Sidgwick and are notable for employing Charlotte Brontë at Swarcliffe Hall.
