= Darnall Hall =

Darnall Hall was a large hall that was constructed in 1723 in Darnall, Sheffield, England. The house was constructed by Samuel Staniforth (1698-1748) as a residence for himself and his wife Alethea Macro, daughter of Thomas Macro of Bury St Edmunds.

== History ==
In Staniforthiana or Recollections a book published in 1863 by Frances Margery Hext, great-granddaughter of Samuel Staniforth Esq. and daughter of Thomas Staniforth former mayor of Liverpool, it is noted that a smaller residence once stood in the halls place which was demolished and the first foundation stone of the new Darnall Hall was laid 22 April 1723.

In the possessions of Samuel's great granddaughter Elizabeth Younge, a note was found, although no name is featured:

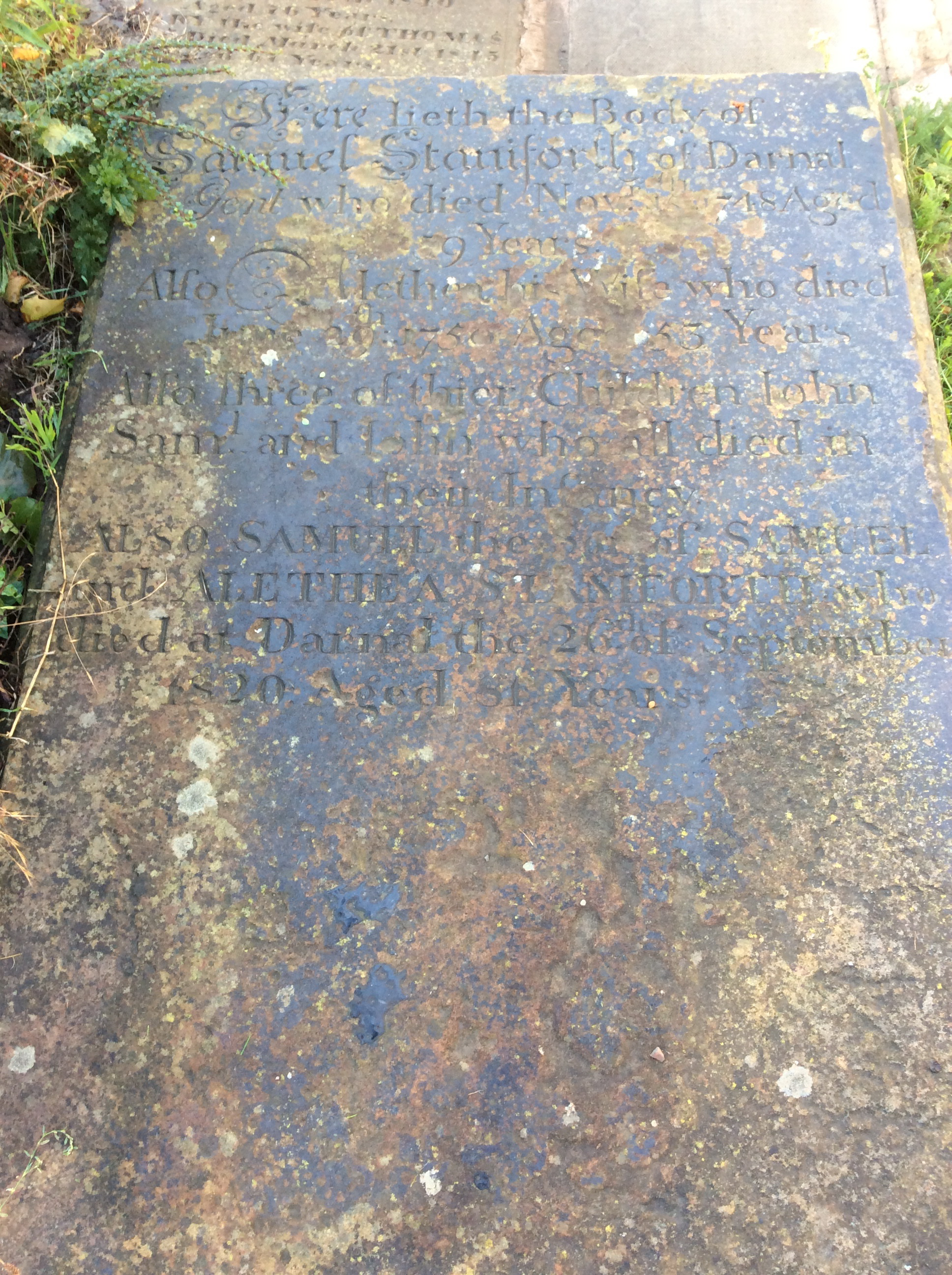
The Grave of Samuel Staniforth and his wife Alethea.

He laid the first stone and she laid the second (most likely referencing Samuel and his wife) on a back corner, that cellar corner next way (or road) and corner as one goes from my gate to John Spartley's. He gave half-a-guinea and she gave two half -crowns; John Staniforth one shilling, and John has a house fronting this and in the line; it was day, about three o'clock p.m.

There was also an inscription in place in the leadwork near the roof of the hall which read:

'This house was built as you may see
In seventeen hundred twenty-three;
This house was built as you may hear;
By Samuel Staniforth in one year.'[2][3]

When the hall was eventually sold by the Staniforth family, this inscription was recovered and can now be found in the nearby village of Kirk Hammerton.

In 1845 the hall was used as a lunatic asylum.

== Later years ==
Sometime in the later years of the hall's existence it was reduced to holding only 2 floors. It was later used to house the Darnall Liberal Club & Institute before being completely destroyed in a fire in April 2010.
