= Healy =

Healy may refer to:

- Healy (surname)
- USCGC Healy (WAGB-20), a United States Coast Guard icebreaker
- Healy (bioresonance device), a pseudoscientific device claiming to use bioresonance to cure diseases.

== Places ==
- Healy (crater), a lunar impact crater on the far side of the Moon
- Healy station, a commuter rail station in Chicago, Illinois
- Healy (volcano), a submarine volcano near New Zealand's Kermadec Islands
- Healy, Alaska, United States
- Healy, Kansas, United States
- Healy Hall, Georgetown University, Washington, DC, United States
- Healy, Queensland, Australia, a suburb of Mount Isa

== See also ==
- Healey (disambiguation)
- Hely, a given name and surname
