= Heeley (disambiguation) =

Heeley is a former cluster of villages now a suburb in the south of the City of Sheffield, England.

Heeley may also refer to:

- Heeley (UK Parliament constituency)
- Heeley F.C., a former English association football club in Sheffield, Yorkshire
- Heeley railway station, a former railway station in Sheffield, England
- Queen of Heeley (1855–1925), popular name of Felicia Dorothea Kate Dover who was convicted of manslaughter in 1882

== People ==
- Dave Heeley, blind English marathon runner
- Desmond Heeley (1931–2016), British set and costume designer
- Mark Heeley (born 1959), English footballer
- Mary Heeley (1911–2002), British tennis player

== See also ==
- Healey (disambiguation)
