= Hely =

Hely is both a given name and a surname. As a surname, it may be of English or Irish origin, either being a variant of Ely, Healey, or deriving from Irish Ó hÉilidhe / Ó hÉalaighthe.

== Given name ==
- Hely Ollarves (born 1981), Venezuelan athlete
- Hely Yánes (born 1967), Venezuelan boxer

== Surname ==
- Cuthbert Hely, English lutenist and composer
- Frederick Augustus Hely (1794–1836), Australian public servant
- Hovenden Hely (1823–1872), Australian explorer and politician
- Sir John Hely (died 1701), English-born Irish judge
- Peter Hely (1944–2005), Australian judge
- Steve Hely, American writer
- William Hely (1909–1970), Royal Australian Air Force officer

== See also ==
- Healy (disambiguation)
- Hely-Hutchinson
