= Crown vs Kate Dover =

Victorian criminal trial

Crown vs Felicia Dorothea Kate Dover
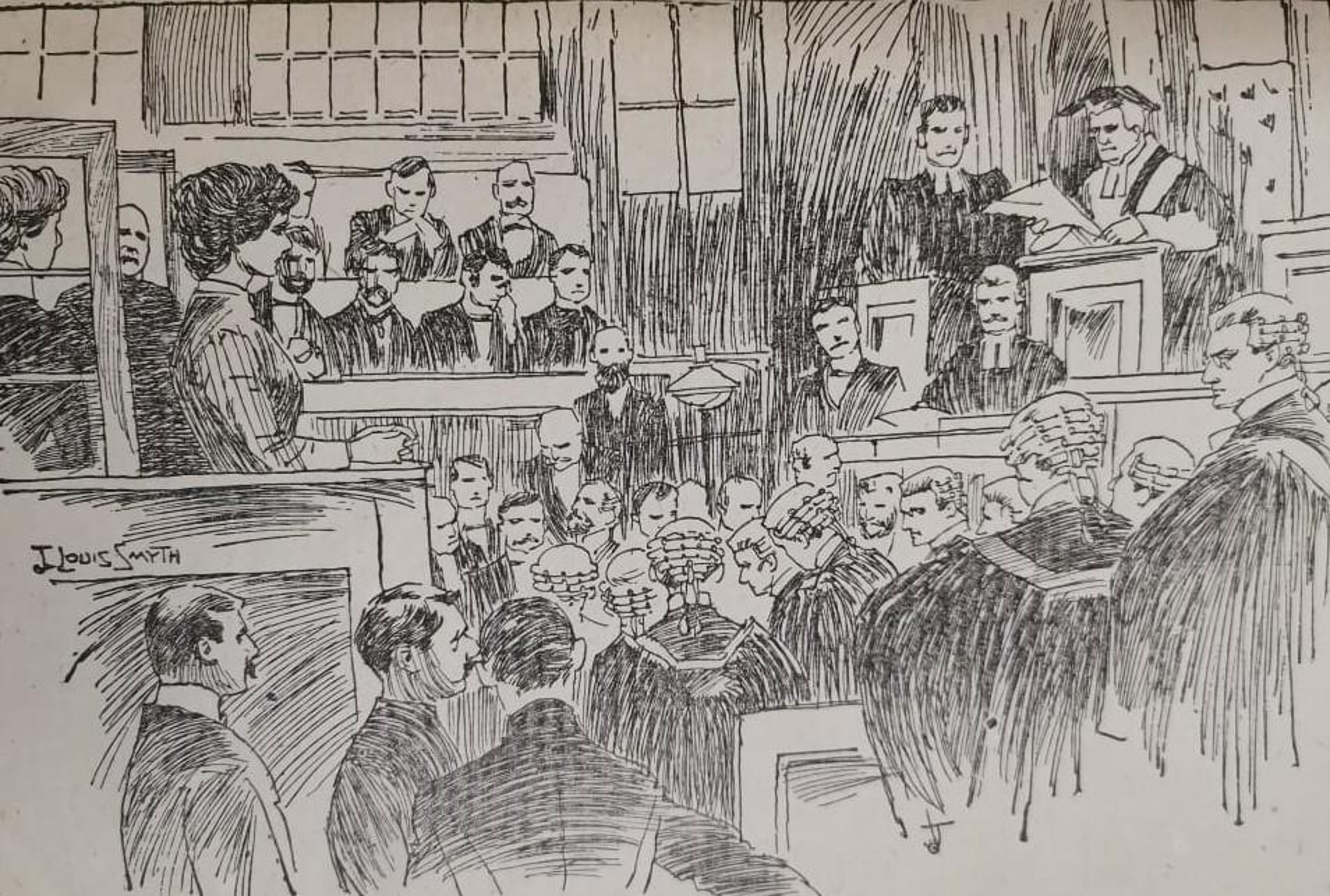
- Courtroom drawing, showing Kate Dover and Justice Cave,1882
- Court: Leeds Winter Assizes 1882
- Decided: 8 February 1882

Court membership
- Judge sitting: Lewis Cave

Keywords
- Arsenic poisoning Manslaughter; Penal servitude Life imprisonment

The trial of Kate Dover of February 1882, before Mr Justice Cave, was a major event at the criminal court in Leeds Town Hall, Leeds, West Yorkshire, England. It was attended by many people, and attracted much newspaper publicity. It followed the death of Kate Dover's 61-year-old employer and lover, Thomas Skinner, from arsenic poisoning. Known as the Queen of Heeley for her fashionable taste in clothes, Dover was 27 years old at the time, and was Skinner's housekeeper. She was convicted of manslaughter, and sentenced to penal servitude for life, which she served at Woking Female Prison. By 1901, she was out of jail. She lived her remaining years with her sisters in Rotherham.

== Kate Dover, perpetrator ==
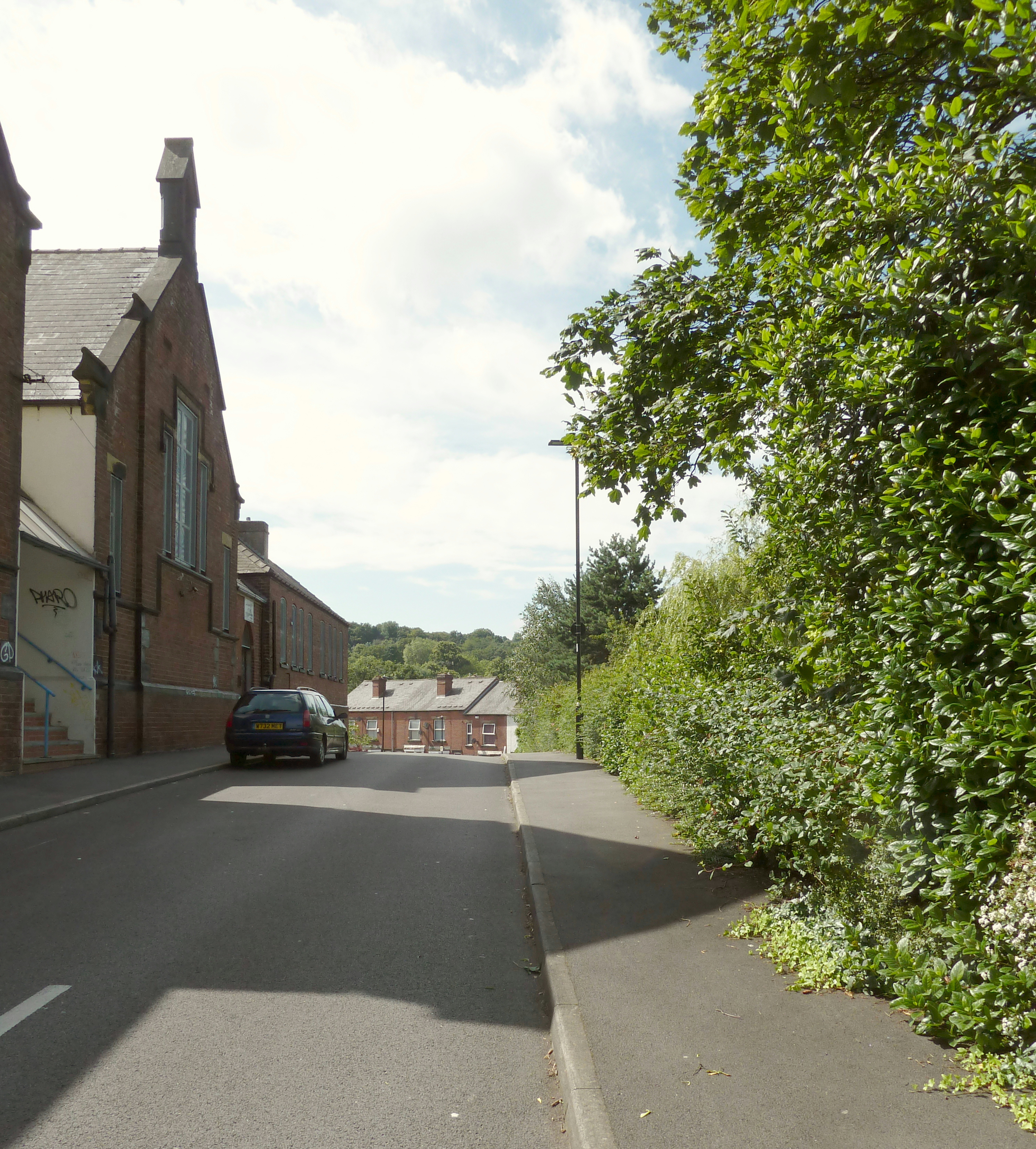
The trees on the right mark the former site of 4 Thirlwell Terrace, Kate Dover's home

Kate Dover (Sheffield, 1855 – Rotherham, 26 March 1925) was the daughter of a woodcarver. She lived with her family at 4 Thirlwell Terrace, Heeley, Sheffield, in the West Riding of Yorkshire. According to The Scotsman and The Sheffield Independent, Dover was known as the Queen of Heeley due to her use of make-up and fashionable clothes. She became a housekeeper to Thomas Skinner of 24 Glover Place, Sheffield, who was also her "sweetheart".

== Thomas Skinner, victim ==
Thomas Skinner (Sheffield, 16 June 1819 – Sheffield, 6 December 1881) was an etcher, inventor and amateur oil-painter. When he met the 26-year-old Kate Dover in 1880, he was a widower aged 60 years, a drunkard, and was fairly well-to-do as a result of the income from his invention which related to etching on steel blades.

== Events ==
=== Background ===
A previous employee of the victim played a major part in the events surrounding the crime. She was Mrs Jane Jones, who before her marriage was briefly a shop assistant at Cole Brothers, Fargate, then entered service as Skinner's wife Mellond's nurse in 1874, becoming his housekeeper in 1876 when Mellond died. Jane married William Jones in February 1878 and he moved into Glover Place with her and Skinner. That situation continued until 1880. Skinner had taught Jane his trade, and she "assisted him considerably" in his work. "So proficient had this woman become that there was a kind of partnership between Mr and Mrs Jones and (Skinner) with regard to the household expenses; they shared the profits." In total, by spring 1880 Jane Jones had been Skinner's housekeeper "for nearly three years."

In 1880, Dover "kept a confectioner's shop", also described as a spice shop, in London Road, Sheffield, and Skinner was still living at 24 Glover Place. Dover and Skinner met at the sweet shop in April 1880, she asked to see his paintings, and they began to visit each other. In response, Jane Jones and her husband left Skinner's house in September of the same year because they "objected to the conduct" of Dover. "From what was observed by Mr. Jones, and Mrs. Jones also, Mr. Jones did not think it advisable his wife should stay longer in the deceased's house." Later, Ada Wheatley gave an example of this behaviour, which she observed on the day when the onions were delivered: "Kate Dover was sitting on Mr Skinner's knee, and he said to (Dover), Lay down, love, and let us have a nap." Roasan Biggins, a niece of Skinner, took over as housekeeper for six weeks, then Dover took over her position. By that point, Skinner was already courting Dover "with a view to marrying her." The neighbour Elizabeth Guest at number 25 said that Skinner gave Dover ten shillings per week as household expenses, but expected a daily quart of beer and quart of milk out of this money, so that the limited funds forced Dover to pawn Skinner's belongings, such as "his tea service and suit of black clothes." Unlike Jones, Dover did not live with Skinner, but returned "home to Heeley at night." The 1881 Census shows Skinner living alone.

Although the relationship between Skinner and Dover was initially "amicable", by June 1881 it had deteriorated into "quarrels", "bickerings" and "many complaints" from Skinner that Dover had "been in the habit of taking his property out of the house and pawning it. The best tea service, he said, had gone, his best suit of clothes had been pawned, and the quarrels continued up to that time with aggravation." Once, Skinner "resorted with actual violence" towards Dover. This state of affairs continued through November and early December 1881. The last two major quarrels were witnessed by the neighbour Elizabeth Guest, who said that Skinner was angry about the pawning of his property, and used "very bad language" to Dover, "who, after being reviled, threw her arms round his neck and pleaded for forgiveness." Nevertheless, Dover said later that they had spoken of marriage. Elizabeth Guest said that Dover had spoken of marriage with Skinner, and Kate Dover's mother Catharine Dover later confirmed that the couple were engaged. Skinner would say sometimes that he had made a will in favour of Jane Jones, but suggested that he would change it in favour of Kate Dover. In early November, Dover was looking for a house of her own, and complaining about Skinner's behaviour regarding money. On 18 November 1881 Dover accidentally dropped a cheque which had been tampered with. The cheque was picked up by a bystander and later handed to the police.

=== Purchase of poison ===
On 2 December 1881, Jane Jones received a gift of produce including onions and potatoes, "from her husband's brother in Bedfordshire". On the same day she and her husband ate some of the produce, and forwarded the remainder, including "fifteen potatoes, four large onions and some apples" to Thomas Skinner. Ada Wheatley delivered the vegetables. On receipt, Skinner said, "These are extra to what we get here", but Dover said "Humph", and "pitched the onions down the cellar steps". On the same day, Dover asked the chemist J.J. Redding for prussic acid on sugar to kill a cat, but he refused because cats do not eat sugar.

On 5 December, Skinner was in good health, working, "eating heartily" and "calling for his beer". At the same time, Dover was declaring him "very ill indeed; and she intimated a suspicion that he might die". At 7 pm Skinner visited the Mason's Arms at Norton Woodseats, known then and now as the Big Tree Inn, leaving Dover at his house. However at 7:30 pm Dover went to Mr Hewitt the chemist on Abbeydale Road, Sheffield, (Note: It was said by the Prosecution at the Sheffield Stipendiary Court on 23 December 1881 that Dover had already attempted unsuccessfully on three occasions to obtain chloroform and prussic acid from the chemist Mr Ridings of London Road.) asking for an ounce of arsenic. She brought with her as a witness the butcher William Wood of London Road, Heeley, telling him two untruths: that their acquaintance Mr Marshall or Maxwell had previously acted at her witness (Marshall or Maxwell denied that subsequently), and that she was purchasing arsenic for colouring wax flowers (it was confirmed at the trial that arsenic on its own is not a colourant and that there were no wax flowers in the house). John William Arding the assistant sold her one-ounce avoirdupois of arsenic in powder form, in a "peculiar shaped packet, labelled poison in black letters upon a red ground, so that it could not easily be mistaken". As Dover left the chemist's shop, she declared, "Now I have got it I will take the lot". She then joined Skinner at the Big Tree Inn, where she and Skinner were "quite friendly" enough to be regarded as lovers, he offered to buy her a pony, and the couple left together at a quarter to nine. The inn was "a favourite resort of 'courters' ...the pair were "freely known as the 'Heeley Queen and her old sweetheart'".

A different story was told by Kate Dover's mother Catharine at the inquest. She said that her daughter had "bought the poison at Mr Skinner's request, and that he told her to say it was for artificial flowers or anything, that her daughter gave it to Mr Skinner that evening...that Mr Skinner put it in his waistcoat pocket, and...she had never clapped eyes on it again". Catharine's supposition was that Skinner had accidentally mixed the arsenic with his etching chemicals, and these chemicals had accidentally mixed with the food in the kitchen. This story did not make it to the Leeds Assizes in 1882. On 6 December, Dover told another witness, Mr Taylor, that "Mr Skinner was very ill and she feared he would die". However, when the servant Emma Bolsover brought back a fowl which Dover had sent her to collect at 10 am, she heard Skinner call out three times for his dinner, showing no sign of illness.

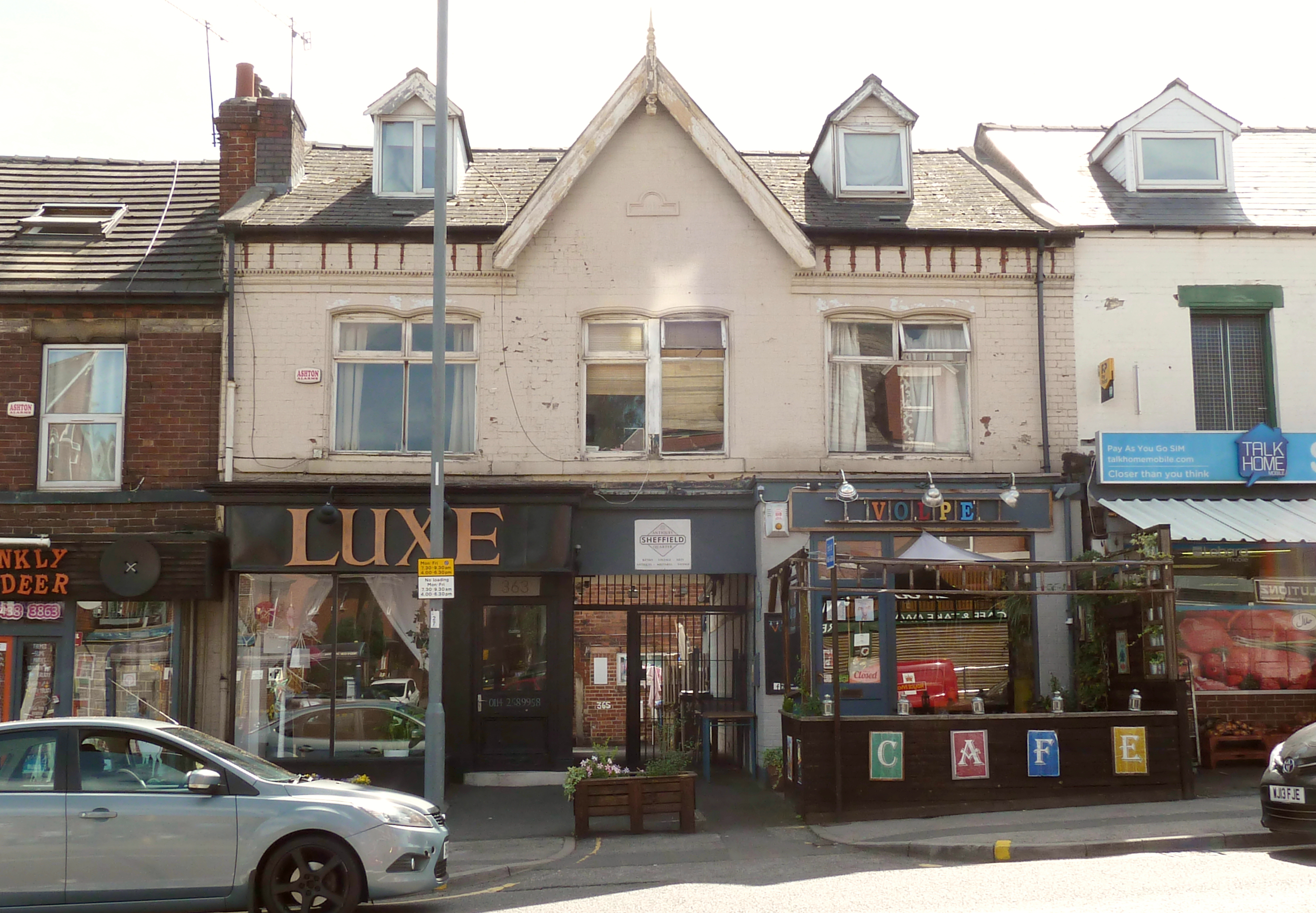
The former pharmacy where Kate Dover bought the arsenic

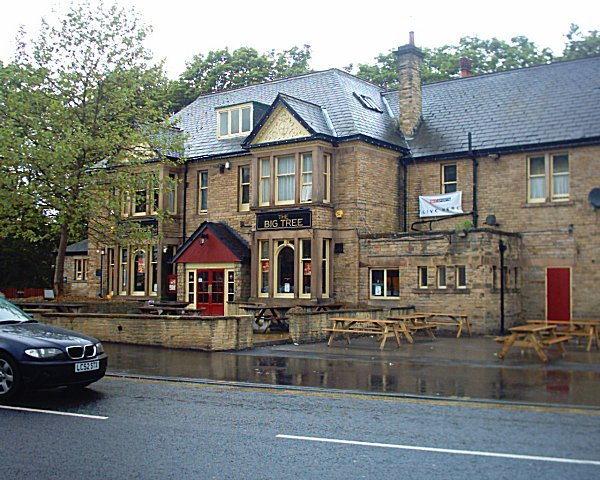
The Big Tree pub where Kate Dover and Thomas Skinner had a friendly drink, the night before his death

=== Poisoning ===
Thomas Skinner was killed on 6 December 1881. On that morning, Dover told Taylor that Skinner "was very ill, and always dozing and sleepy, and said she believed he would die", when in truth he "appeared to have been in his usual state of health". Dover "was the one that made the dinner and attended to it in all respects". Although Dover had prepared a roast chicken, she made goose stuffing with herbs, bread and onions, not chicken stuffing of forcemeat or sausage meat as was usual in the Victorian era. Moreover, she split the stuffing into two portions, cooking one portion inside the chicken, and one in a separate tin. Dinner consisting of stuffed chicken and Yorkshire pudding was served around midday, but the servant Emma Bolsover ate a lamb chop separately in the kitchen and did not join Dover and Skinner for the meal. Skinner called out for his meal, saying that "he did not know when he felt so hungry as he did then", however he had to wait another half-hour for his meal. Skinner's plate was piled with stuffing but Dover's was much less so. Five minutes after beginning the meal, Dover declared herself ill. Skinner immediately said, "I feel bad too...My God, she has done for us both this time," referring to Jane Jones who had sent the onions. He then "vomited, very considerably", and "seemed to be suffering very much". Dover "seemed to have got frightened, (possibly) at the results of administering the poison, and was trying to remedy what she had done".

Emma was sent to purchase tincture of lobelia, which can be used somewhat unsafely as an emetic at high doses. Dover could not wait until Bolsover's return, panicked, and followed her by tram. After they returned, Dover sent Bolsover to fetch Catharine Dover, who arrived surprised to find Skinner so ill. Meanwhile, Dover said she felt sick, and appeared to heave, but did not vomit at all until the doctor administered an emetic later. Dover "seemed to have been alarmed, and did what she could to render assistance". When the surgeon and forensic scientist James Wallin Harrison arrived at 2.30 pm, Skinner was "vomiting very seriously and heavily" and Dover said, "We have both been poisoned; it is that woman who has done us both." Harrison saw that Skinner was dying of arsenic poisoning, gave what care he could, and searched for the source of the poison. The vomit from Skinner which was in the scullery sink, vomit from Dover as a result of the emetic, besides the remains of the chicken, the stuffing, some excreta and some wine, were therefore respectively bottled for tests and analysis. Harrison left at 4:00 pm and returned in the evening, when "he found Skinner's skin cold and clammy, his countenance pinched, his hands and feet benumbed, and symptoms of collapse", while Dover showed no poisoning symptoms. Harrison stayed with Skinner until he died at 8:40 pm. (Note: National Archives record of death duties: see Index To Death Duty Registers 1796–1903, Birth, Marriage, Death & Parish Records, Wills and Probate, ref. IR27/419. Court of Probate: South Collingham. Executor William Skinner of Weston and another, Court PR, folio 1583)

Dover said that just before Skinner died he requested that some papers be burned, although the doctor and inspector had witnessed that he did not. While the doctor and inspector were in the scullery with the dying Skinner, Dover was seen by Skinner's neighbour Elizabeth "Sissie" Guest fetching papers from upstairs, including a large blue or white paper, and burning them in the kitchen fire. She was also seen handing a paper containing powder to her mother, telling Catharine to hide it under her skirt in case Kate were searched by police. Before burning the papers, "(Dover's) conduct had been very excited, but it then changed completely. It was quite calm." Dover afterwards told Inspector Bradbury of the police that she had not burned any. She also denied that there had been arsenic in her possession or in the house, and thereafter she maintained that story. She even asked to be searched before leaving the house, but Bradbury refused. Inspectors Bradbury and Womack found no Will for Skinner, although Dover told Skinner that there was a Will, that she did not know its whereabouts, and that Skinner had planned to alter it. (Note: According to Kate Dover, the Will had been written out by one Mr Clegg, solicitor. As it happened Clegg was the employer of Mr Barker who would later represent the Prosecution in the Kate's trial. Strangely enough, the idea of bringing Clegg to the witness stand at any point never arose.) Womack found no arsenic in the house, and arsenic was not used in Skinner's etching process. Only Dover had prepared dinner that day. According to Jane Jones, she and her husband had eaten the same batch of vegetables with no ill effect, Jane bore no ill will towards Dover, and had not threatened to "do for them both". By tea time, both of Dover's parents were in the house. Everyone left the house together at 11 pm, Dover taking Skinner's cat and bird with her. After the death, household linen and American bonds went missing, although Skinner's cash book remained, and Inspector Womack had found fourteen sovereigns and a diamond ring in Skinner's bedroom on the day of his death. Other items found in the house were love letters between Dover and an unknown elderly man named "Emerson" hidden in a picture frame, and "applications for loans made by Mrs Dover to various persons".

=== Post mortem and inquest ===
At the post mortem by the surgeon Harrison on 8 December 1881, examination of the body brought a conclusion of "metallic irritant poisoning". Alfred H. Allen, Sheffield's public analyst, examined Skinner's entrails and the jars of samples held by the police on 10 December. The chicken and its inner stuffing were clear of arsenic, but the stuffing cooked separately in a tin was "loaded with arsenic", sufficiently to kill. He calculated that there were eight grains of arsenic "in the whole stomach", and a "considerable quantity of arsenic" in one sample of stuffing. He found little or no arsenic in the rest of the food and in one sample of vomit. Allen later said that "two grains of arsenic would be a fatal dose. There were 437.5 grains in an ounce". At the inquest of 18 December it was confirmed that Skinner's body was "without disease". The lining of the stomach was congested, and there were "large ulcerations, indicative of poisoning". Skinner's death was "consistent with poisoning by arsenic". Kate Dover was arrested on 18 December at Highfield Police Station, then held at the central police offices at Sheffield.

The inquest into the death of Skinner was opened at the Royal Hotel (later called the Victoria Inn) at the convergence of London Road and Abbeydale Road, Sheffield, on 9 December 1881, and reopened at 1.00 pm on 18 December 1881. Kate's mother Catharine gave evidence "full of contradictions to other witnesses" in place of her daughter who was ill. She spoke of the affection between Kate Dover and Skinner, Kate's need to use make-up to hide her pallid complexion, and the innocent purposes for which Kate obtained various poisons. The coroner published more than thirty love notes between Dover and an old man of 85 years. These had been found hidden in a picture frame at Skinner's house. The letters make clear that Skinner knew about and did not object to meetings between Dover and the old man "Emerson" or "E.M.", who regularly gave her money for clothes. The jury decided twelve to three that Dover had administered the poison to Skinner. The coroner recorded that Dover "wilfully and of malice aforethought did kill and murder the said Thomas Skinner".

=== Remand of Kate Dover ===
Between 6 and 16 December 1881, Dover was kept at home, in a state of "extreme exhaustion", in Thirlwell Terrace under police supervision, ill, unable to go out, denying the crime, nursed by Emma Bolsover and under the care of the surgeon Harrison. On Friday 23 December 1881, Dover was formally charged with wilful murder by the Stipendiary at Sheffield police court in Sheffield Old Town Hall and committed to Leeds Assizes. When charged, "she replied, in a faint, husky voice, I am not guilty." In that Stipendiary session was W.E. Clegg, of W.F. Clegg & Sons, for the prosecution; it was Clegg whom Dover had named as the drawer-up of Skinner's missing Will, although the Court did not raise that point. Dover "appeared extremely weak, and it was with some difficulty that she was brought from her cell". She was defended by A.M. Wilson, of Binney, Sons & Wilson. It was accepted that the motive for the crime was unknown, however a promissory note for £8 10s from Dover's father to Skinner was found among Skinner's effects. It was later found that it was Skinner who had insisted on paying a printer's bill for Charles Dover's book of poetry, so that Charles Dover had responded with the promissory note; and Kate Dover was not involved in the transaction. Following the committal she was removed to Wakefield prison, where she spent time writing letters and drawing flowers to send home. She was allowed to wear her own clothes instead of "prison garb", and was said to be "sanguine that her innocence would be established". Her prisoner number was 3288. On 30 January she was removed to Armley Gaol to await her trial.

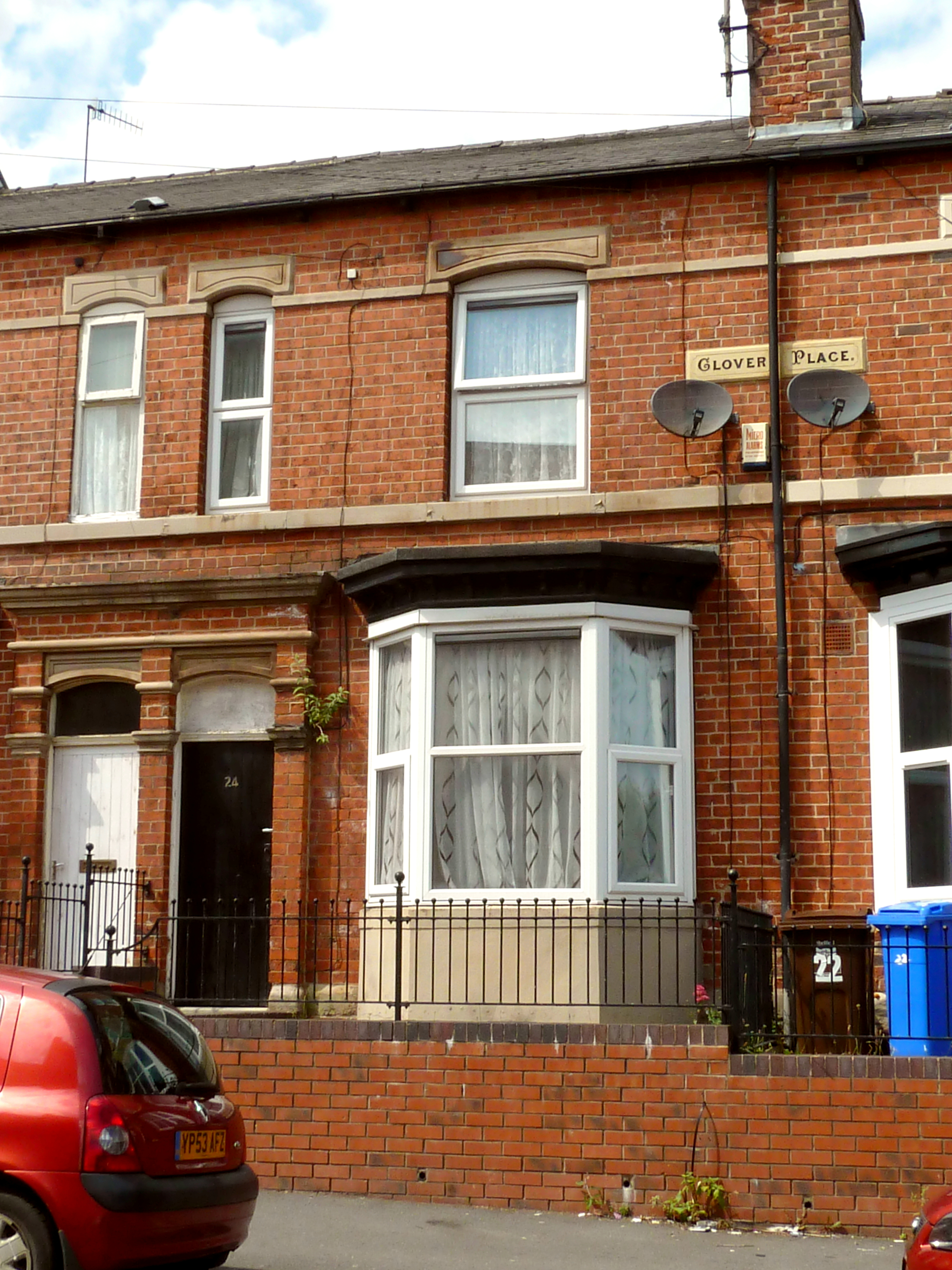
24 Glover Place, where the crime occurred

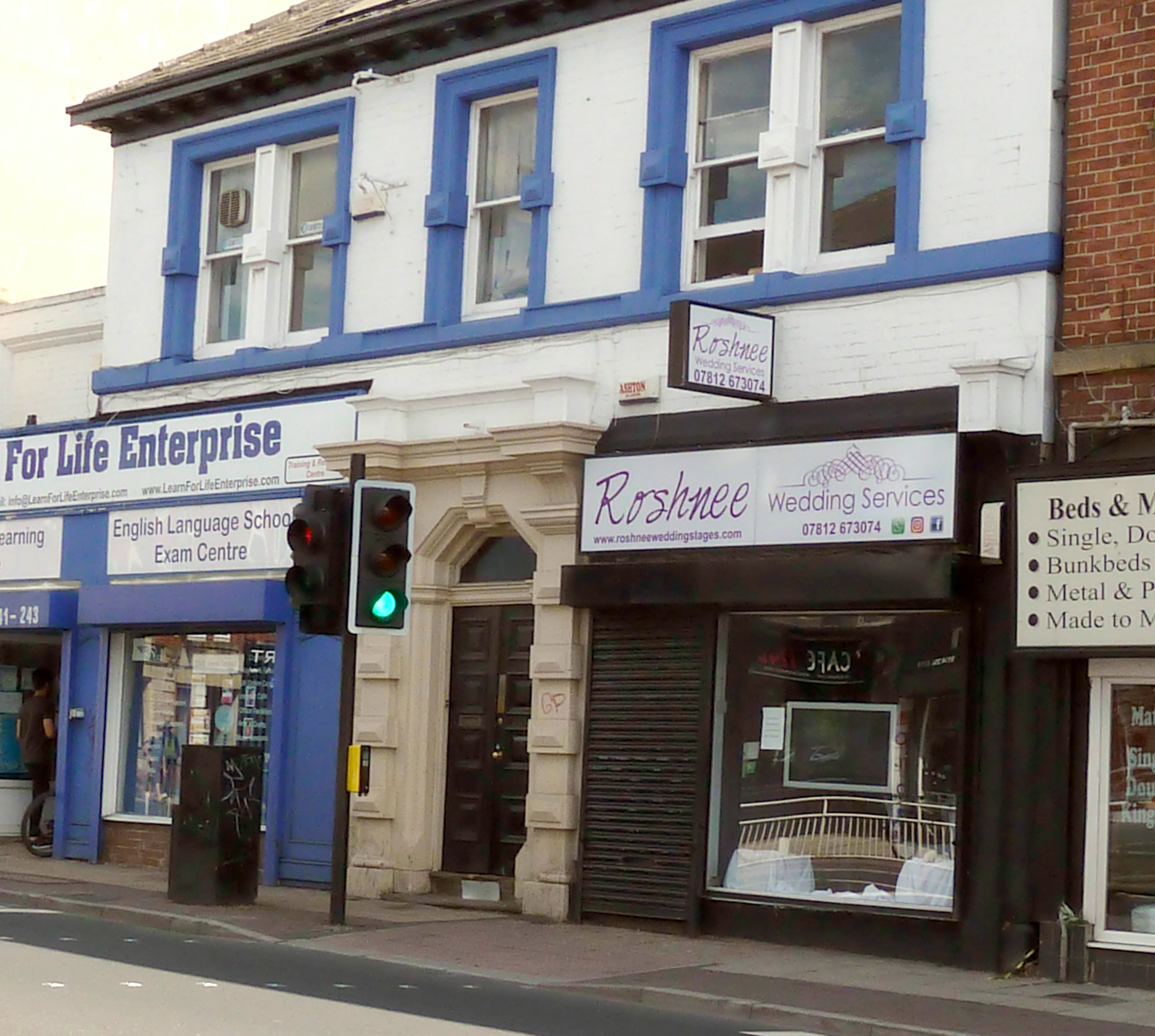
Former Highfield Police Station, where Dover was arrested

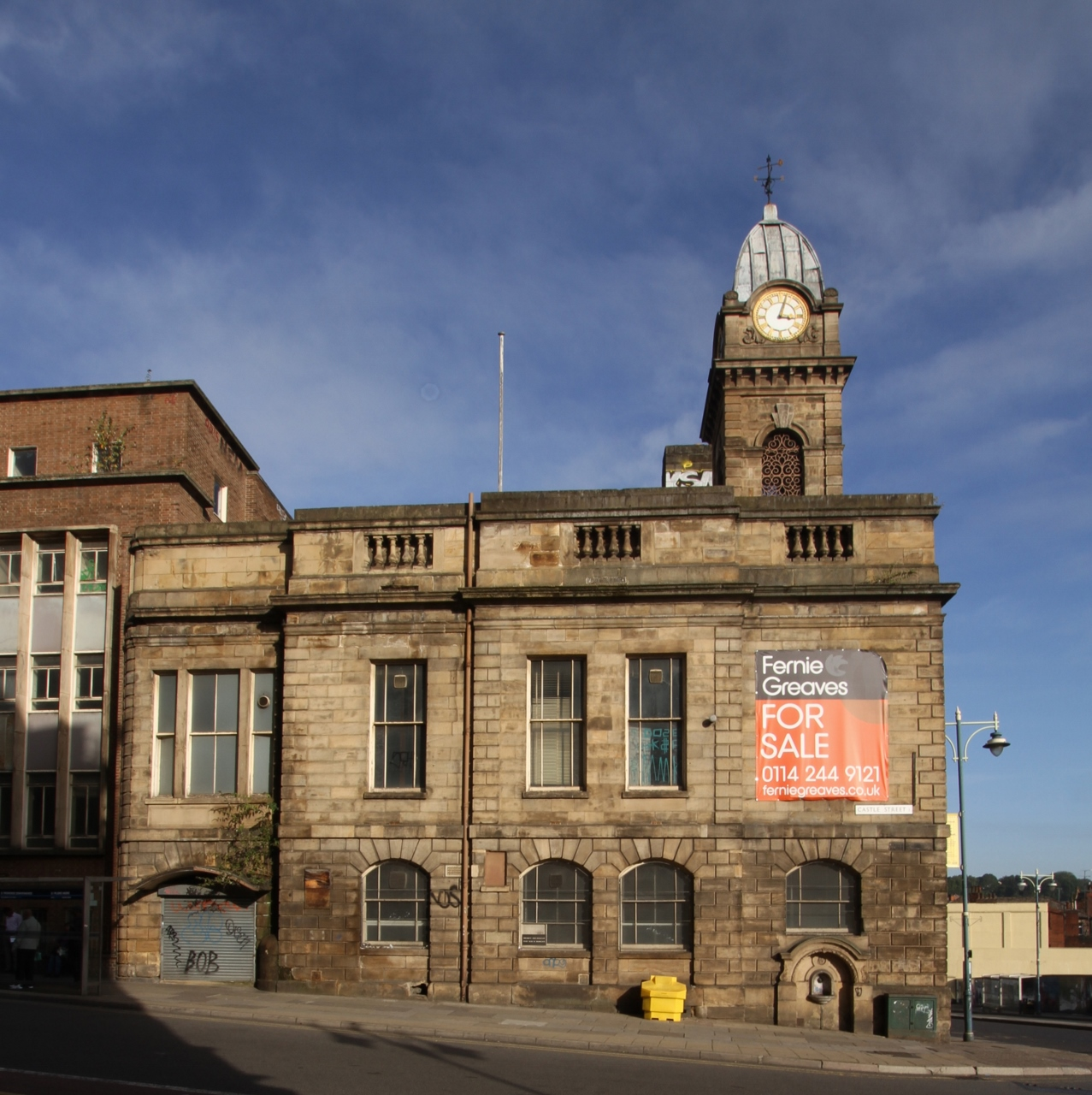
Sheffield Old Town Hall, where Dover was charged with murder

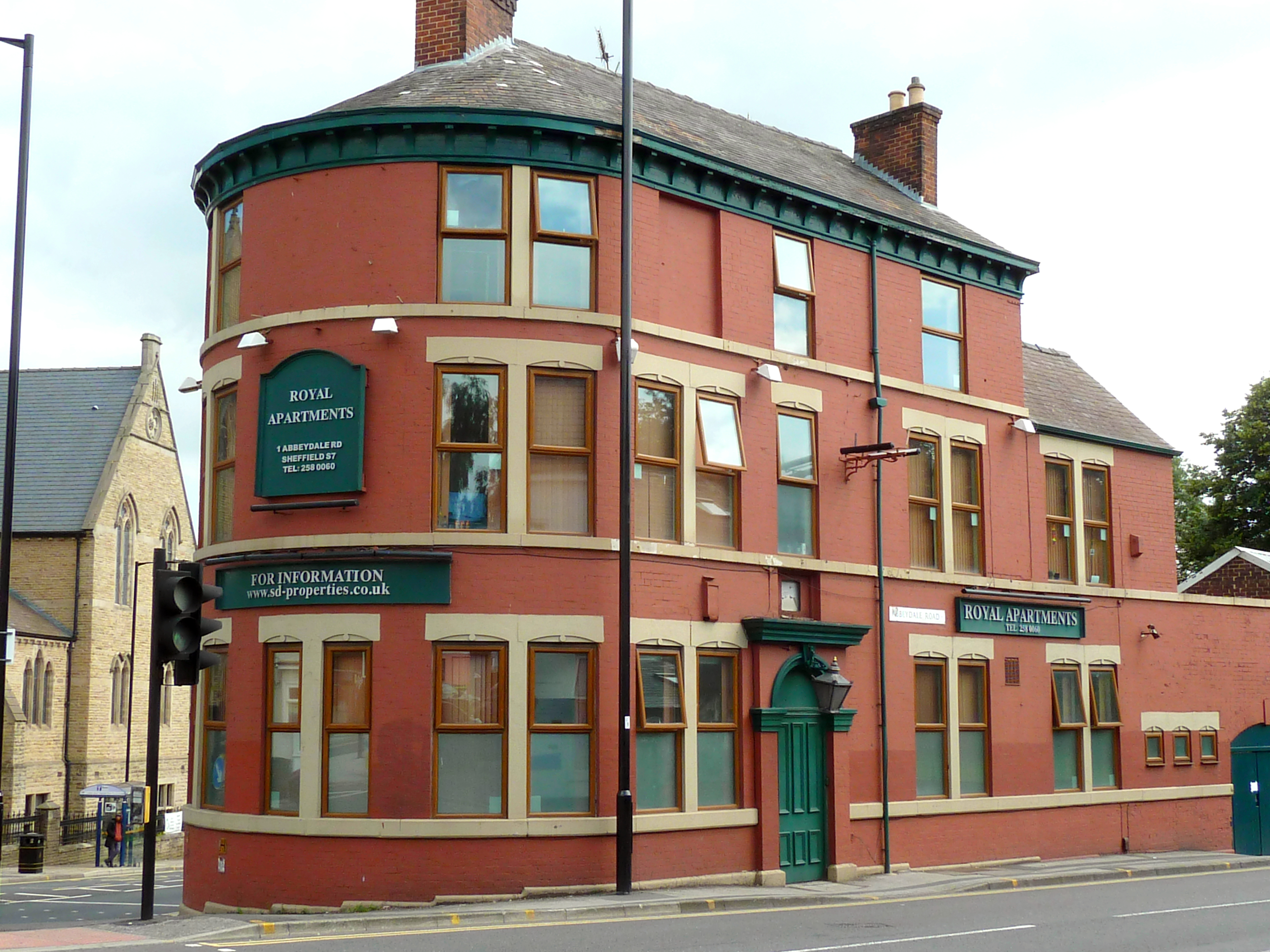
Former Royal Hotel (later Victoria Inn), where the inquest was held

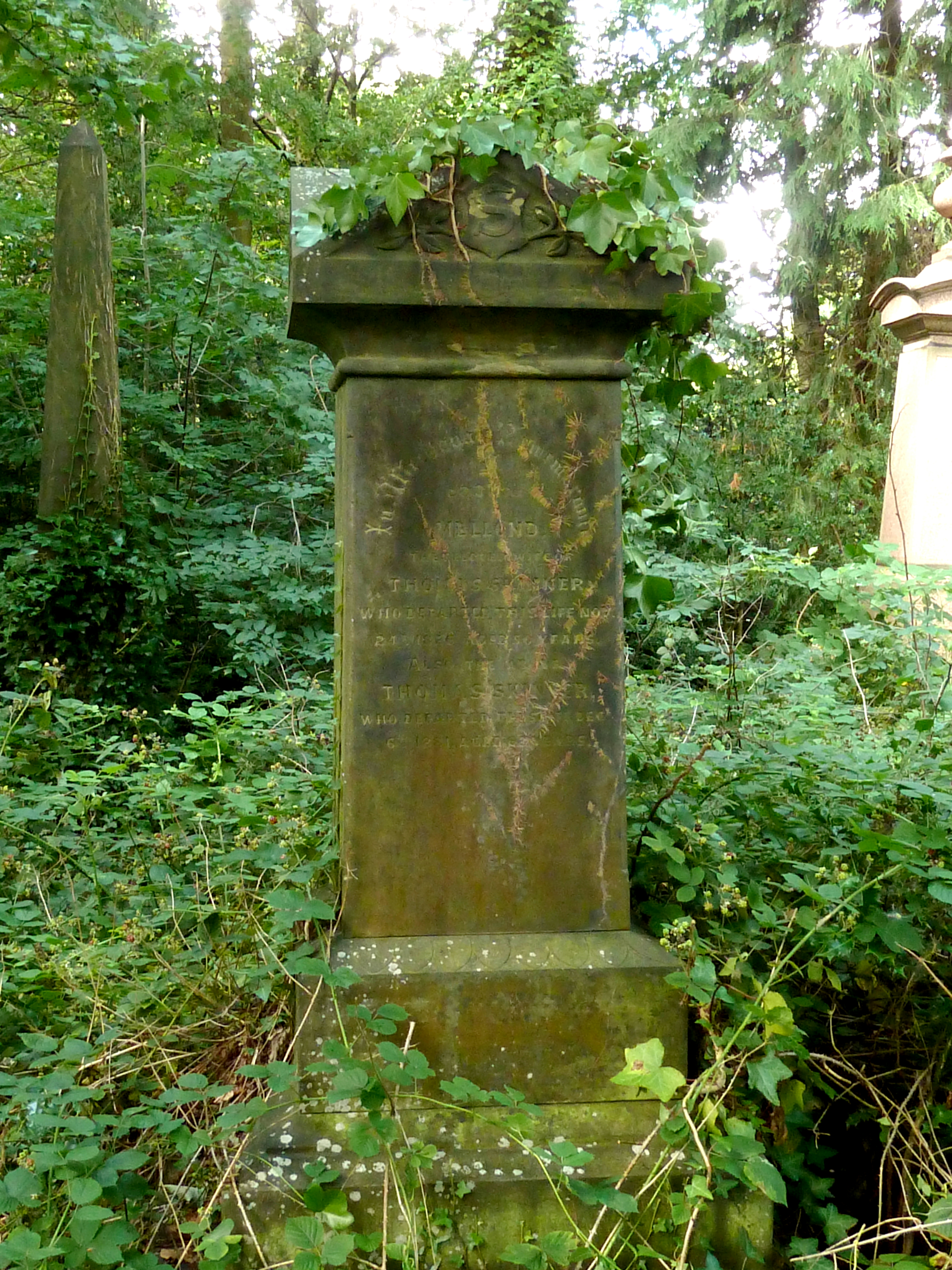
The victim's grave at All Saints Church, Ecclesall

==== Letters home from Kate Dover ====
Letters written home from Wakefield Prison by Dover were published on 31 December 1881. They showed a skilled use of language, and contained poems, quotations, exhortations for confidence in her innocence and hope for her imminent freedom. On 7 January 1882, the Sheffield Daily Telegraph published a letter of 31 December 1881 from Dover at Wakefield Prison to her family, showing optimism, encouragement for her family and again an unexpected linguistic facility. For example: "There is one thing I am certain, and that is if I am to be blessed with freedom God will let the tiny flowers that nestle in the grass kiss these Wakefield feet as though they had never been there." The letter mentions a good relationship with both parents and other relatives, and asks them to feed her pets: "my squirrel, my tortoise, my Jack, my pussies and my birds." This was preceded on 3 January by another published letter, referring to her membership of the Good Templar lodge of which she was a member. They had prayed for her at midnight on New Year's Eve, and she wrote that at the same moment "there seemed to be a ray of light, like the rising of the sun that got brighter and brighter, till the gas, which is always burning in my cell at night, was lost in that other light."

=== Trial ===
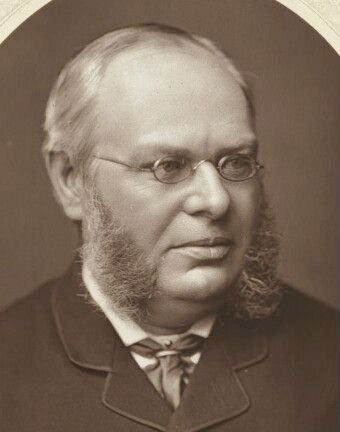
Lewis William Cave JP

On 31 January, Dover was removed from Wakefield Prison to Leeds, ready for her trial at the Leeds Assizes. Her mother Catharine Dover was permitted to accompany her and give her food, and on the next morning Dover had an interview with her solicitor A. Muir Wilson. She "presented him with half a sheet of notepaper upon which she had with no unskilful hand drawn in pencil a bunch of exotic flowers."

The trial took place on Monday 6 and Tuesday 7 February 1882 at Leeds Assizes, in the Criminal Court room of Leeds Town Hall. On the Monday, Dover was indicted before Justice Lewis Cave for wilful murder, and pleaded not guilty. The judge was "burly in person and bluff in manner, and looked, as he was, the very incarnation of sound commonsense." The Liverpool Daily Post described the scene:

The case had created the greatest possible public interest, and the court was densely crowded, admission being obtained by ticket. Indeed, never since the trial of Charles Peace has the public excitement been so intense, hundreds of people being unable to obtain admission. Ladies mustered in unusually strong force. The prisoner, upon being placed in the dock, walked very slowly, and appeared to feel acutely her terrible position. She sobbed violently, and pleaded not guilty in a feeble voice.

Dover was "deeply agitated and sad", and "closely veiled". Mr Waddy QC and Mr Barker spoke on behalf of the prosecution, and Mr Lockwood and Mr Stuart Wortley for the defence. On the Monday, Barker declared to the jury that the evidence showed that Dover did indeed knowingly poison Skinner, but there was no evidence as to her motive. The Sheffield Daily Telegraph described the scene at Leeds as follows:

This morning the court is as crowded as ever, the ladies' gallery being again filled by females of all ages, the majority of them as unlovely as ever, and all armed with sandwich baskets and satchels, prepared to wait till his Lordship rises. Again there are several hundreds of disappointed ones, who try to beguile the policemen into opening the door that they may go in. The officers, however, are hard of heart. They set their faces as flint against the fair suitors, promising that as soon as anybody comes out somebody will be permitted to enter ... Down below in the court there is a crowd of barristers, twirling their thumbs, reading the newspapers, writing letters, and generally industrious in other ways, particularly in making sketches, which the prisoner in the dock could have excelled with a few quick touches of her pencil. They occupy most valuable seats, which would be gladly filled by the Press, who, perched away in the ladies' gallery like the bird who sits up aloft, strain their ears to hear what counsel asks and what witnesses answer ... Kate Dover ... still appears feeble and ill. She is attired in black with sealskin jacket and black hat ... but soon after the proceedings are resumed she raises her veil, and everybody is able to see her features, which certainly do not form a heavy, unintellectual countenance, but the very opposite."

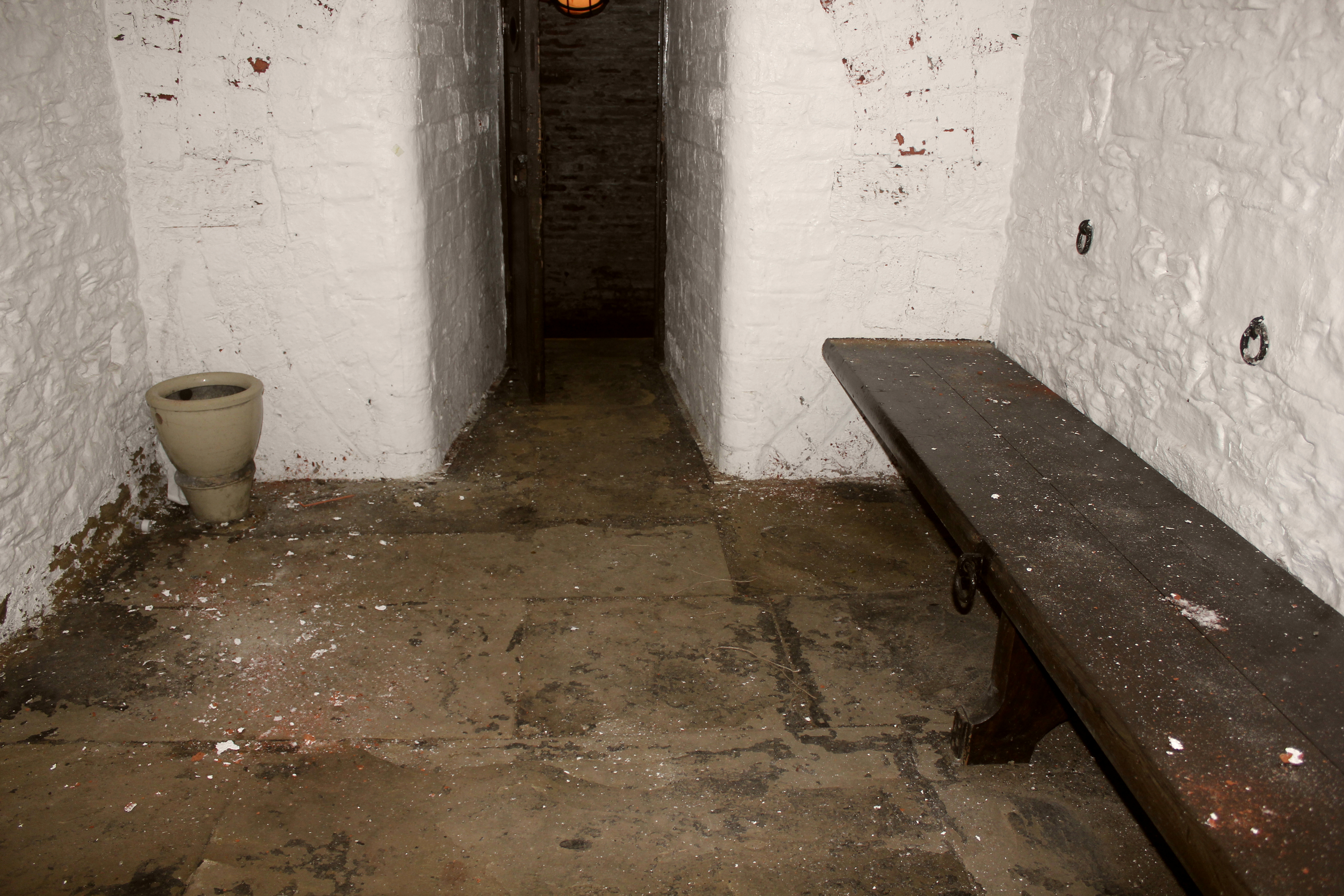
One of the cells where Dover slept during the trial

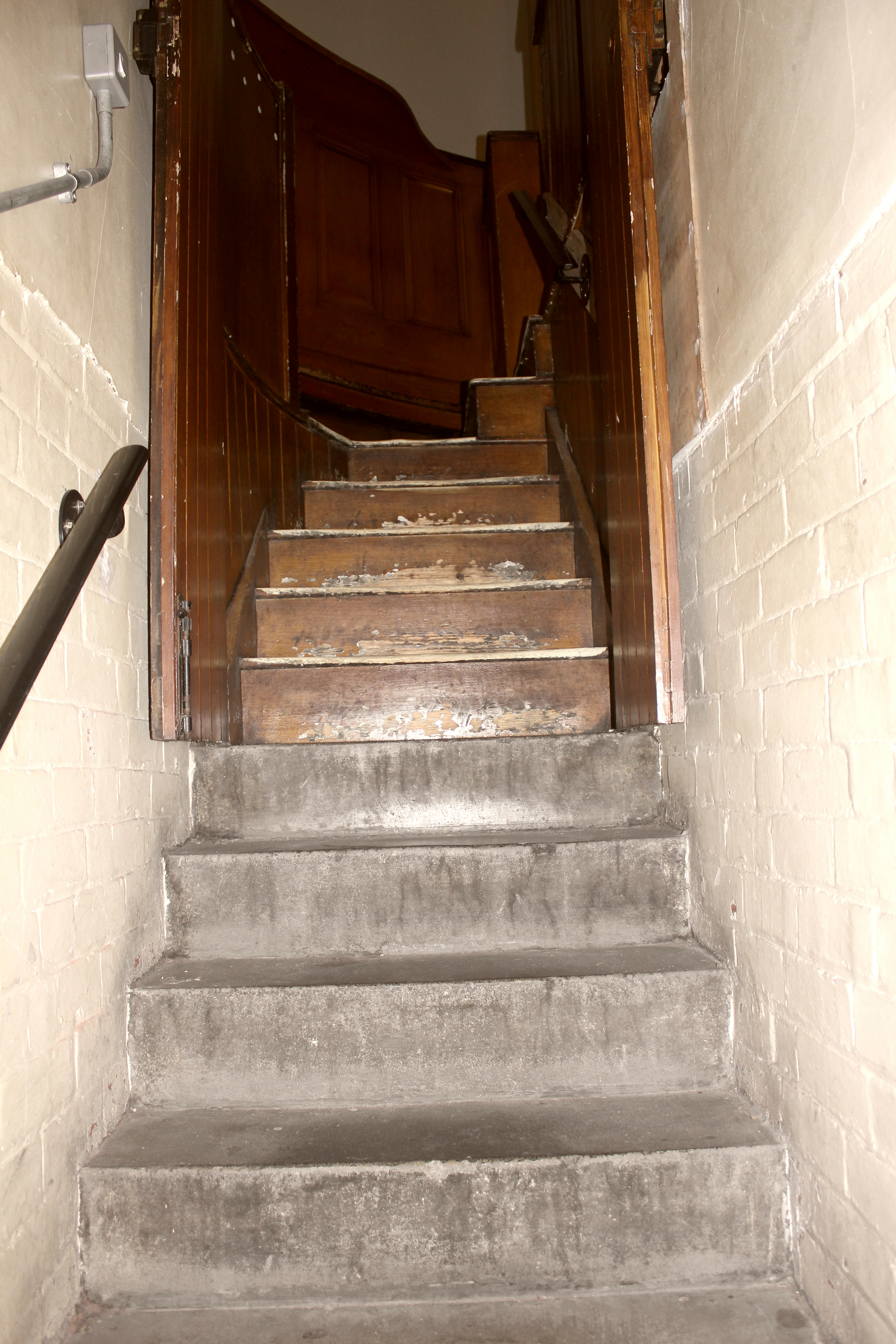
Steps from the cells to the courtroom

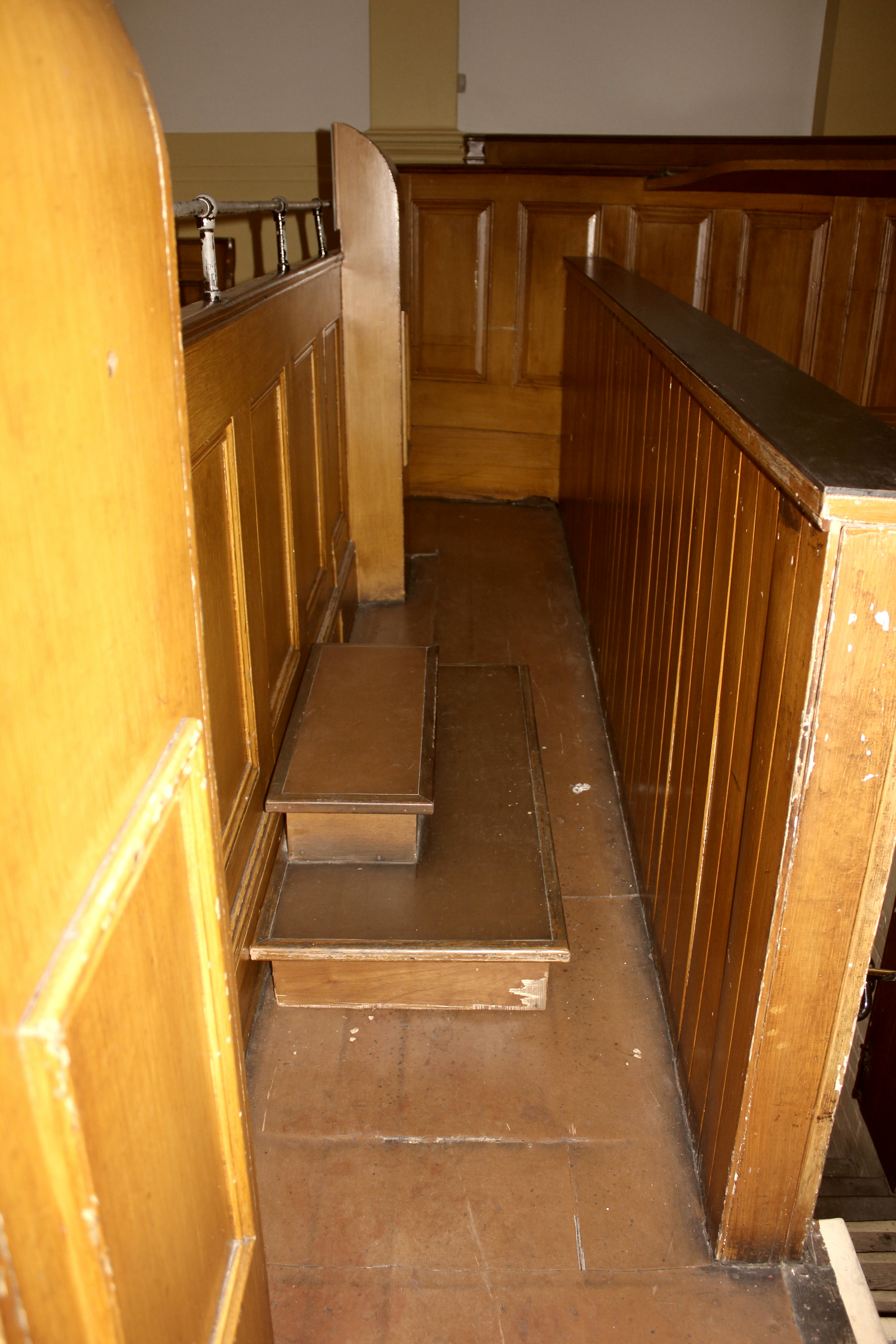
Steps up to dock rail

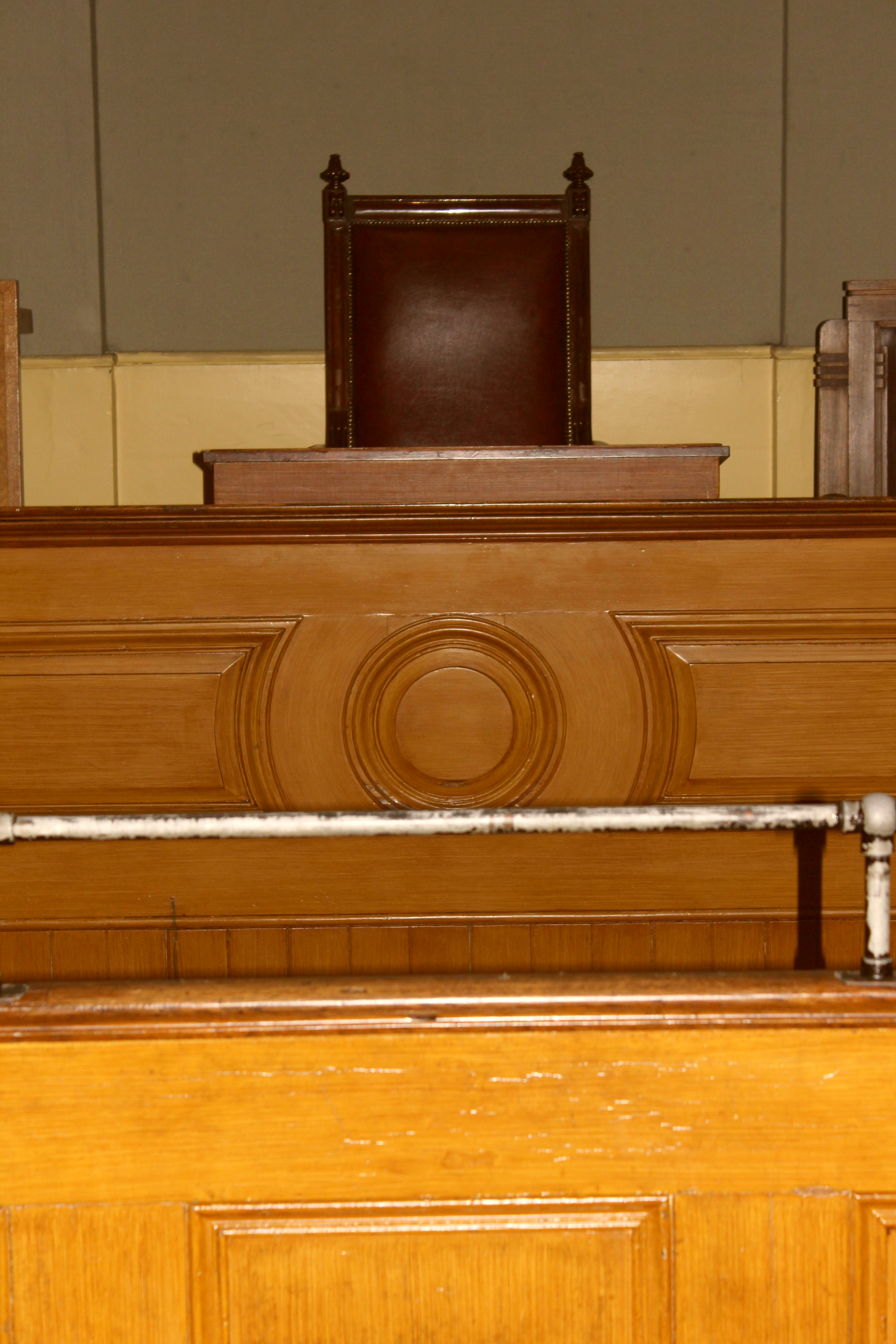
Intimidating view of judge's chair from dock

Lockwood, counsel for the defence, began his speech at 11:10 am by saying that "if she has taken the life of her master ... for that she must surely die." Now, just before Lockwood began his speech, her solicitor spoke to Dover, she averted her face and covered it with a handkerchief. She turned to face the jury, and there was a "great hush in court". Thereafter she appeared "greatly agitated". The Sheffield Daily Telegraph continues: "As Mr Lockwood gravely impresses on the jury that his client is there with her life trembling in the balance, her emotion is intense. From the gallery we can hear her sobbing, we can see her frame quivering, and her whole body rocking to and fro till she seems as if she would roll from her chair ... Several times her hand falls from her face, and it is evidently only by a supreme effort she prevents herself from fainting."

Lockwood spoke of the lovers' quarrels, reconciliations, words of love and talk of marriage. He said that "his hypothesis was that the prisoner had no intention of taking the artist's life. If she perpetrated the act at all, it was a mischievous act perpetrated not for the purpose of killing him, but for the reason only to suggest to his mind that Mrs Jones was unfriendly to him, and the reason for the act might have been suggested when the apples and onions came from Mrs Jones." He said that Dover's behaviour and manner of poisoning showed no "skilful hand" or calculation. He said, moreover, that Dover's panic for the lobelia emetic and the doctor's assistance showed innocence of intent to kill. Lockwood's speech was "not only eloquent, but so pathetic that many of the spectators found themselves, in a half-surreptitious, shame-faced way, wiping the tears from their eyes. Again the Sheffield newspaper describes Dover's reaction: "The prisoner's agitation increases at every sentence Mr Lockwood utters. She sobs bitterly, sways herself to and fro, and seems utterly lost in agony. Does the line of defence overwhelm her? It certainly offers her no hope or comfort, and seems to deepen the despair which has sat upon her all this morning." When the arsenic is mentioned, "the prisoner is again terribly affected – leaning forward, holding her head in her hands, swaying her body to and fro, and sobbing violently." Lockwood had spoken for nearly two hours.

Justice Cave's summing up took one hour. He gave the jury the following choice:

If they adopted the theory of the prosecution that she put the arsenic into the stuffing, and that she did it with the intention to kill him, then undoubtedly she would be guilty of murder. If they adopted the suggestion of the counsel for the defence that she put arsenic into the stuffing and did it only to cause some unpleasant symptoms and not with the intention of taking his life, and that the loss of his life was beyond her intention, that would not be murder, but manslaughter, and it would be their duty to find the verdict of manslaughter. If they did not think either of these theories were proper ones, or if the arsenic got there accidentally ... they must acquit her."

The Sheffield Daily Telegraph said that, "his closing words ... evidently caused the prisoner great agony, as she was again sobbing violently, and rocking her body to and fro as in serious pain." "The prisoner, who lifted her veil as she went, with tottering steps, from the dock, was exceedingly pale, and there were many traces of tears on her ashen face.

After two hours of deliberation by the jury, Dover returned to the dock "with painful step and slow. Her veil is raised, and though she walks with downcast head, we see she is very pale, and looks the image of despair. Who shall tell the agony which has been crowded into nearly two hours of waiting for the verdict? Now, as she stands with drooping head and twitching hands in the centre of the dock, she appears as if she had prematurely aged during the brief period she has been down below ... the prisoner appears as if she would totter from her feet." "She clasped the rail in front, and with bowed head waited for the words that might rudely cut short her life, or give her liberty." To the surprise of the court which expected either a hanging or an acquittal, Dover was found guilty of manslaughter. Justice Cave said:

Kate Dover, the jury adopted a view which was presented to them by your learned counsel, and they found you guilty of manslaughter; but the circumstances of your offence are so grave and so atrocious that they are separated but by a very thin line from the offence of murder. In such circumstances I must pass upon you the heaviest sentence in my power, and that is that you be kept in penal servitude for the term of your natural life."

"Not a sound escapes the prisoner's lips. Her head falls on her shoulders ... Without once raising her head to meet the hundreds of hungry eyes which are watching her every pang, Kate Dover turns from the railings and with melancholy gait and pitiful face passes down the steps and into the cells ... The crowd of females rustled out of Court, which is slow and noisy work. They have seen their unfortunate fellow-creature drain her bitter cup to the dregs, and they hurry home now to boast, no doubt, that they were present at the memorable trial of Kate Dover for murdering her master." Catharine Dover was permitted to speak with her daughter after the verdict. She reported Dover "in good spirits" but said that she blamed those who testified against her, rather than the process of law. Kate would bear her sentence with fortitude, looking forward to seeing her friends and relatives "when she came out ... Conscious of her innocence, she felt entirely unmoved by her conviction ... While in Wakefield she had made all love her ... and such she felt confident would be her case when she was in the new prison to which she might be sent." Kate Dover was sentenced on Wednesday 8 February, entering the dock "with slow step" and staggering to the rail to support herself by it with both hands, seeming hardly conscious of the proceedings. She did not reply to the sentence. Cave called her offence "atrocious" and sentenced her to penal servitude for life. Dover promptly fell "all of a heap" and was carried away to the cells. One juror said afterwards that the jury returned a manslaughter verdict because the majority did not want to hang a woman.

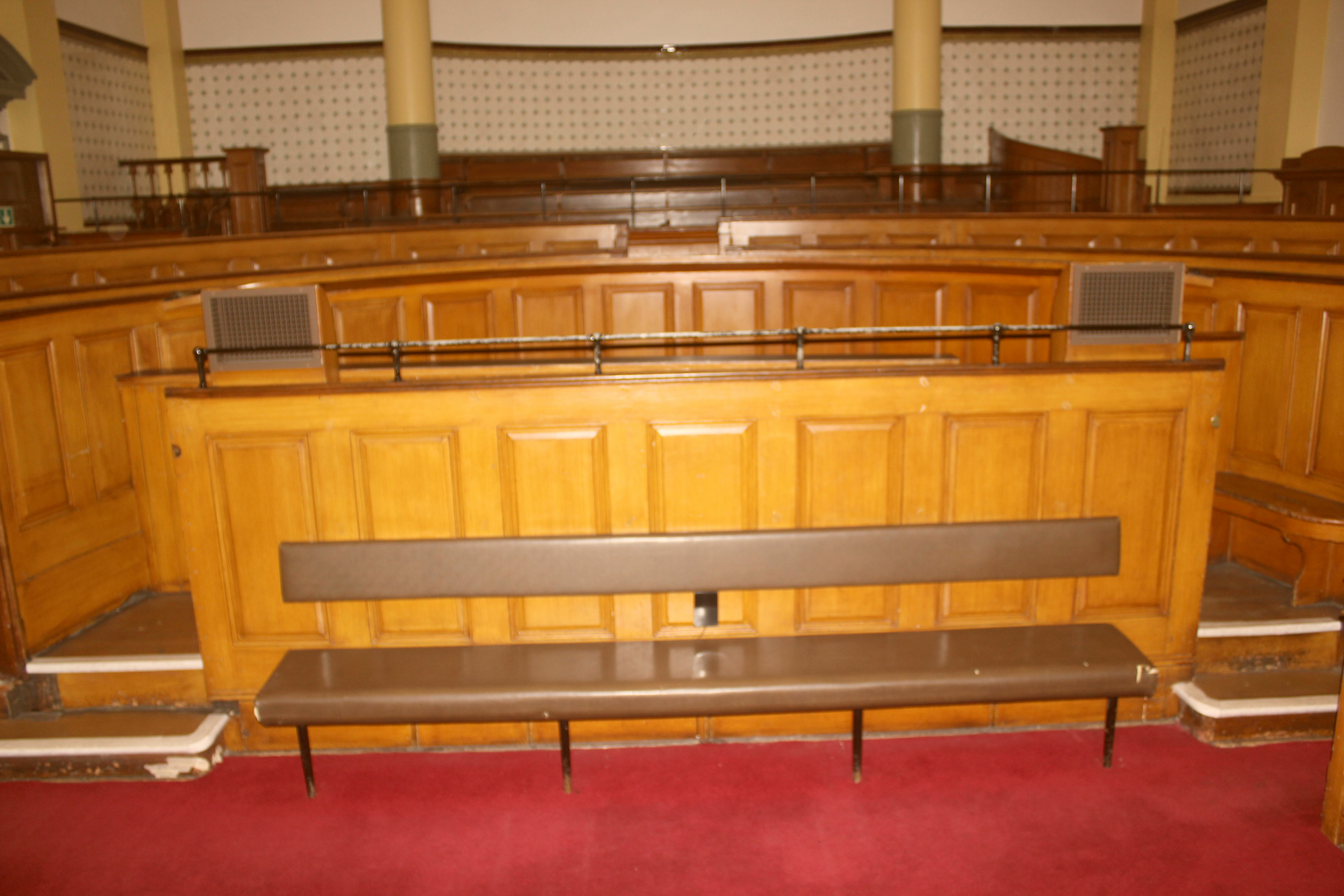
Judge's view: front to back: defendant, barristers and solicitors, spectators and journalists

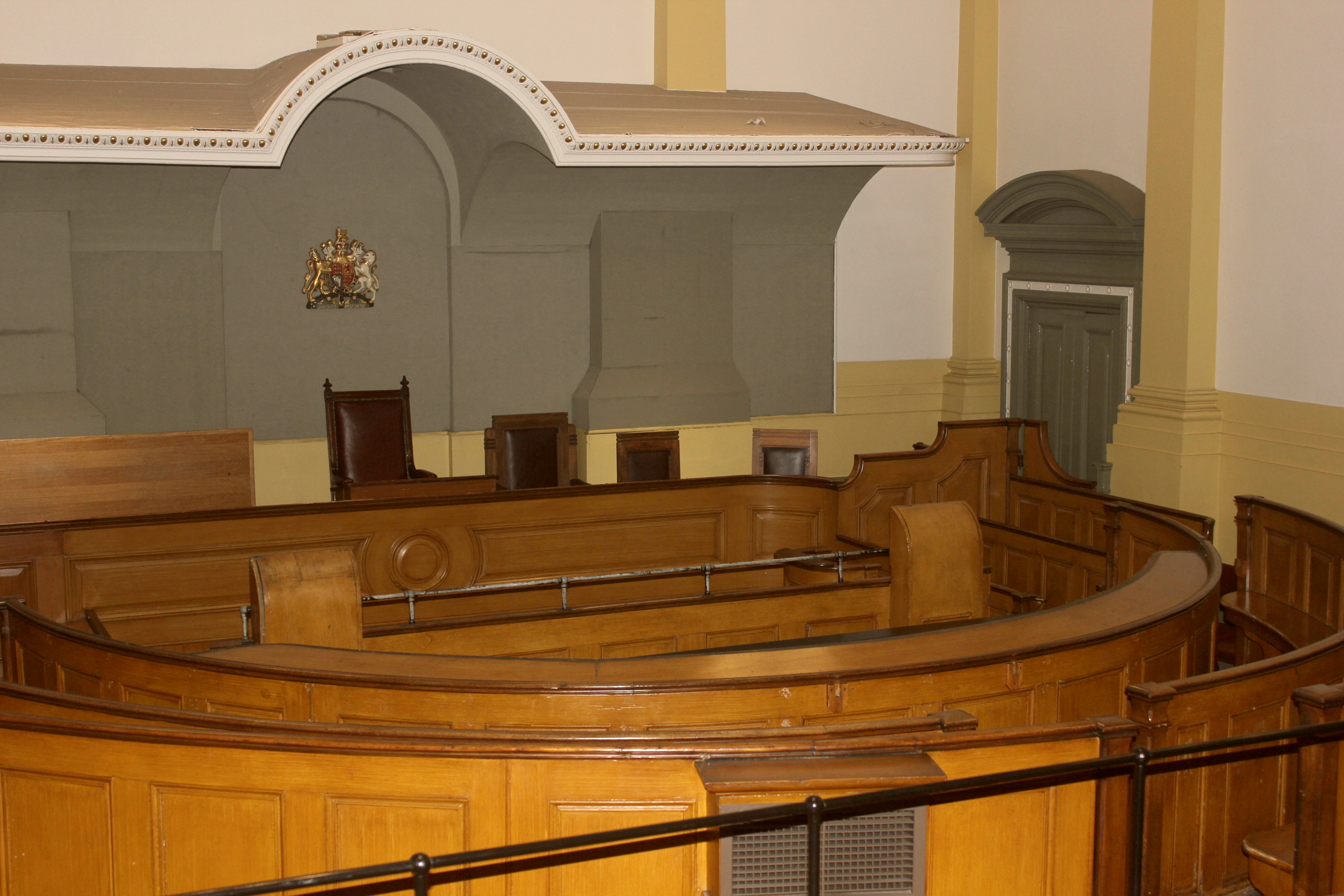
Spectators' and journalists' view of courtroom

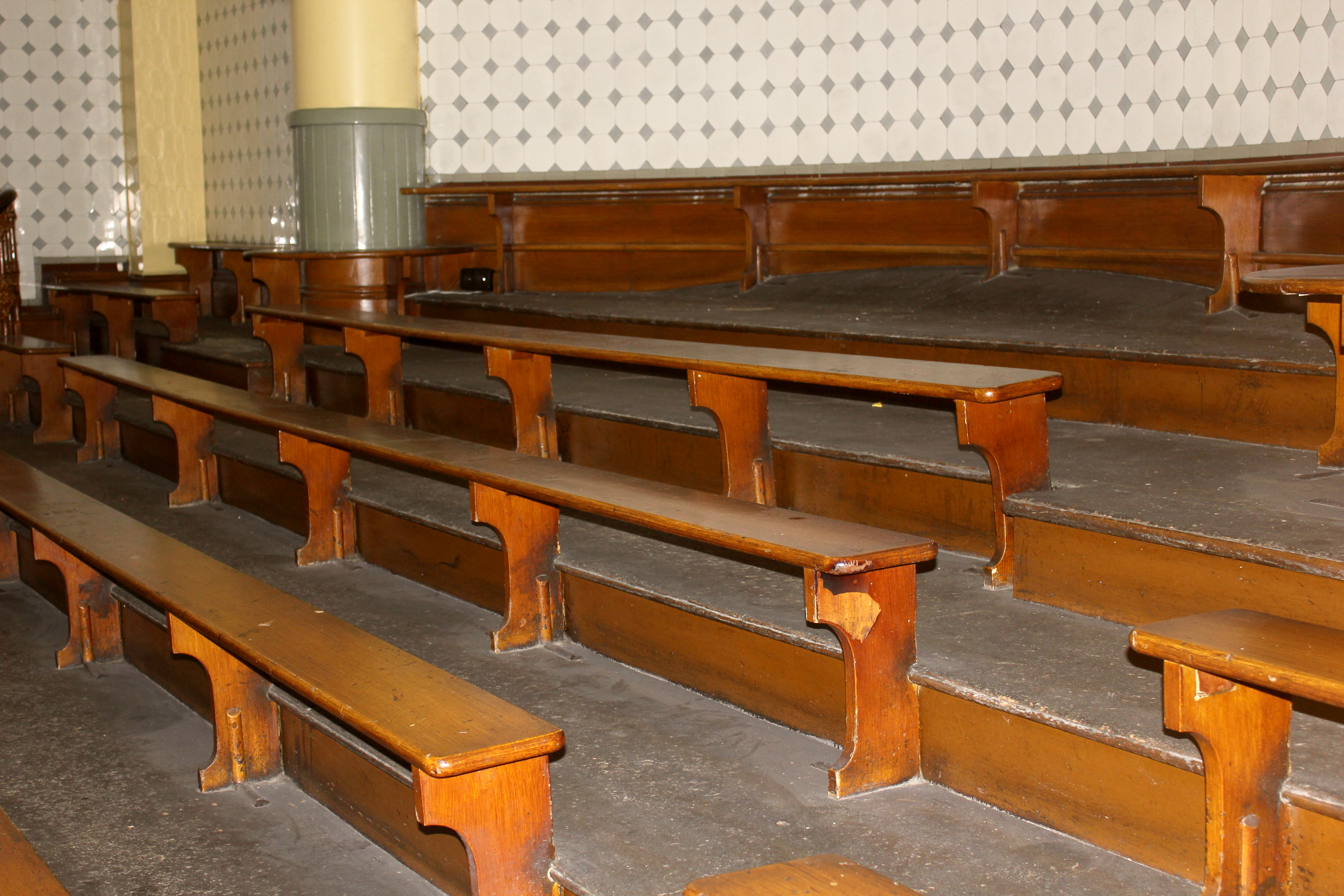
Gallery where the journalists sat

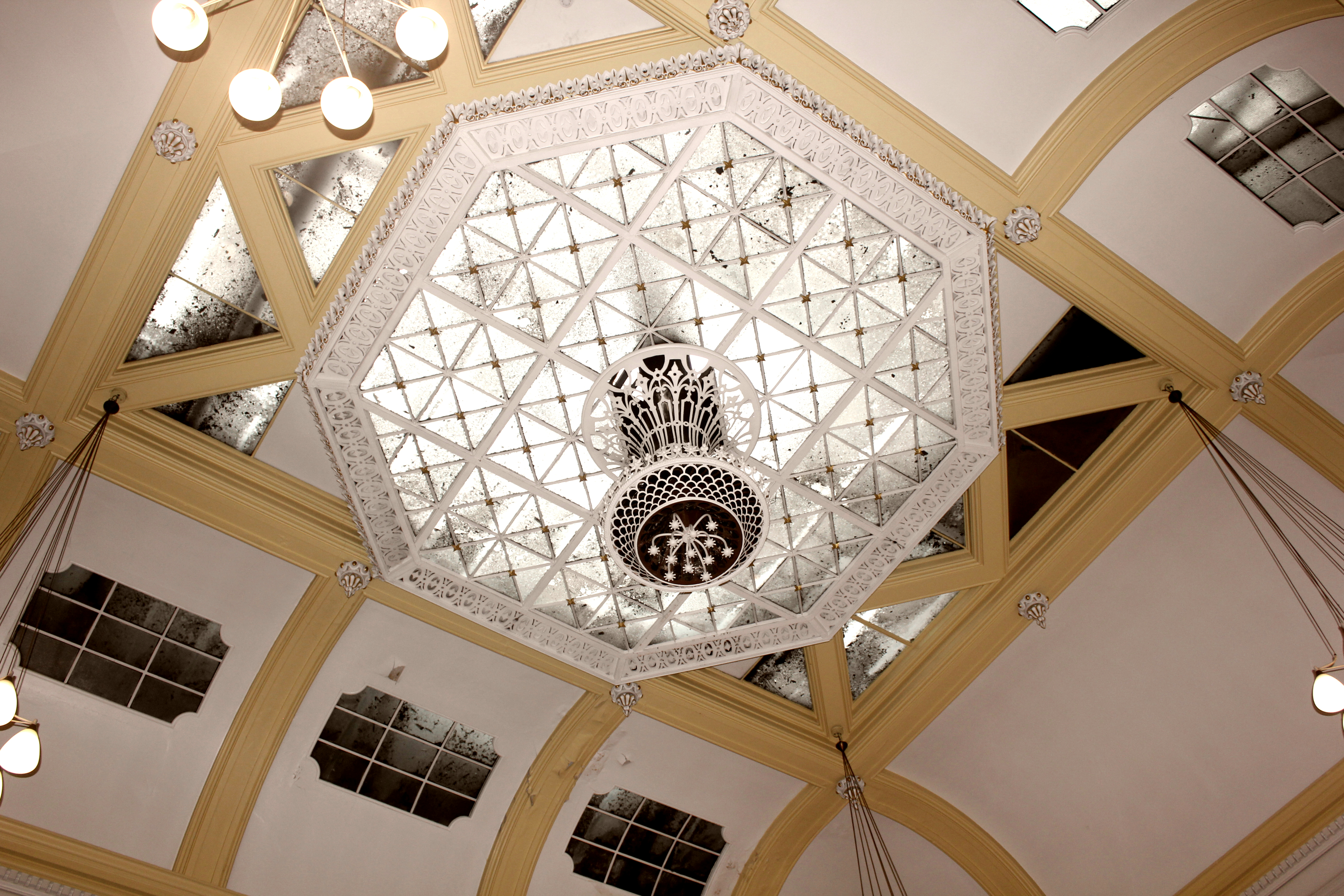
Courtroom ceiling

=== Imprisonment ===
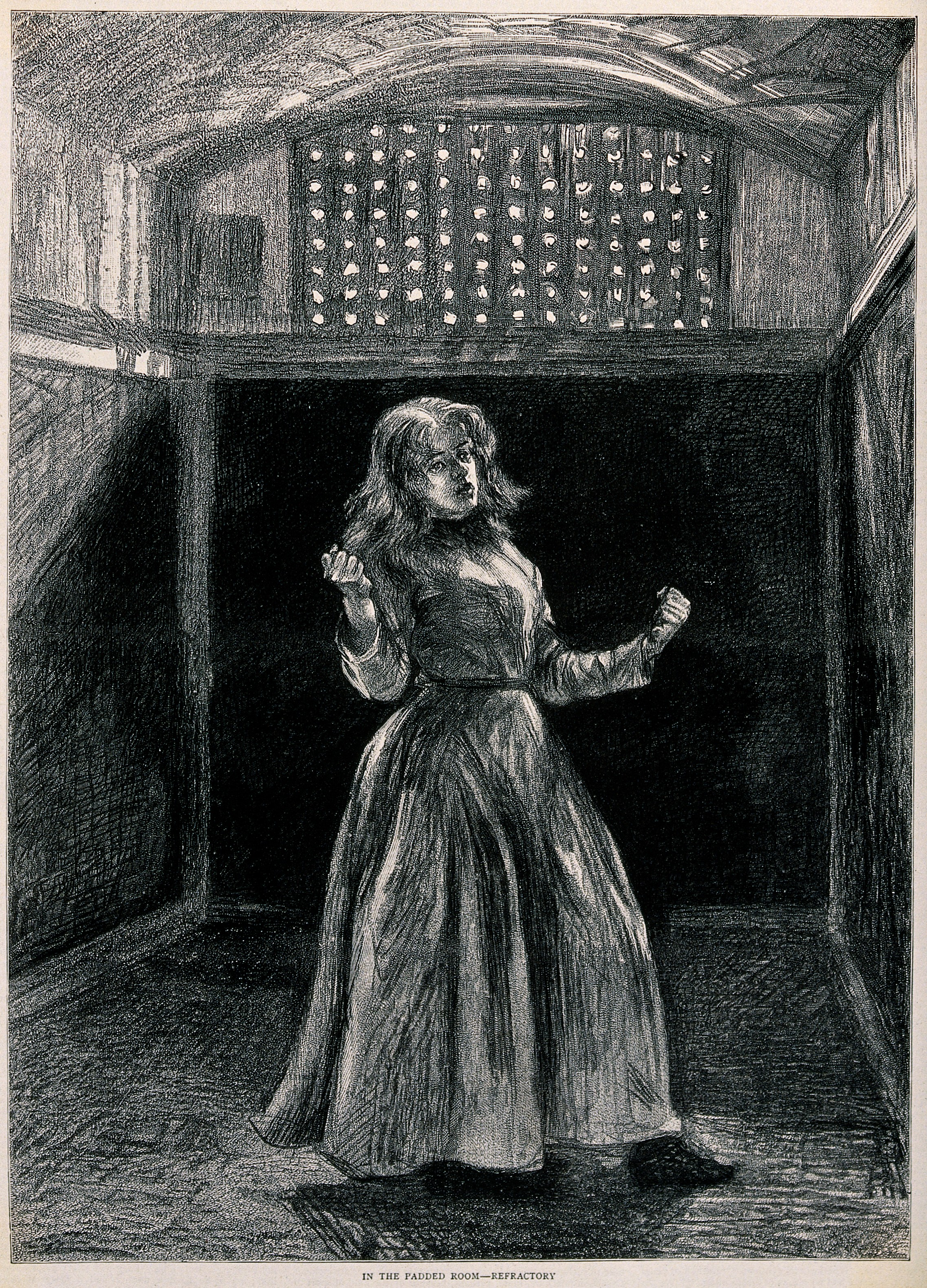
Punishment cell, Woking Female Prison, 1889

Dover did not go straight to Woking Female Prison where she spent most of her sentence. On 21 February 1882 she was still at Wakefield, and expecting to be sent to Pentonville. However, by 1891, at age 36, Dover was a convict at Woking Female Prison at Knaphill, Woking, Surrey, listing her former profession as domestic housekeeper. Woking was the "first purpose-built female prison", opened in 1869 and closed in 1895 when the inmates were transferred to Aylesbury female prison which had been converted for women in the same year. At Woking, women could work in prison kitchens or the laundry. Some were paid to do tailoring, sewing or knitting. Woking had a mosaics department where the women broke up marble for mosaic flooring for installation at St Paul's Cathedral, the South Kensington museums and elsewhere.

In 1895 a petition to the Home Secretary – permitted after 15 years' servitude – was raised by the 1882 trial's counsels for her defence and the prosecution, for Dover's release from prison. However the Home Secretary declined the request. By 1901 Dover was out of prison, so she had probably served between thirteen and nineteen years.

== Aftermath ==
Mrs Jane Jones (1853– Ecclesall 1883), Skinner's former housekeeper, died at Ecclesall Workhouse infirmary on 20 May 1883, citing injuries caused when her estranged husband William kicked and struck her on 12 May – although he denied it. Jane had married William Jones in February 1878, and, before the association of Skinner and Dover, had been living with Jones at Skinner's house. At the inquest at Sheffield on 21 May 1883, it was decided that because Jane Jones had separated from her husband since Skinner's death, had subsequently led a "most abandoned life", and had then died suddenly from a "congestion of the lungs", there was no necessity for a post mortem, and a verdict of "death from natural causes" would be returned.
