= Healey =

Healey may refer to:

== People ==
- Chadwyck-Healey baronets, an English baronetcy seated in Surrey
- Healey (surname), people with the surname Healey
- Healey Willan (1880-1968), Anglo-Canadian composer

== Places in England ==
- Healey, Greater Manchester
- Healey, Northumberland
- Healey, North Yorkshire
- Healey, Kirklees, West Yorkshire
- Healey, Ossett, Wakefield, West Yorkshire
- Healey Nab, an area of countryside east of Chorley, Lancashire

== Other uses ==
- Healey (automobile), various car manufacturers and models bearing the Healey name
- Healey Building, a skyscraper in Atlanta, Georgia, U.S.
- T. J. Healey

== See also ==
- Healy (disambiguation)
- Heeley (disambiguation)
