= Healy (crater) =

Crater on the Moon

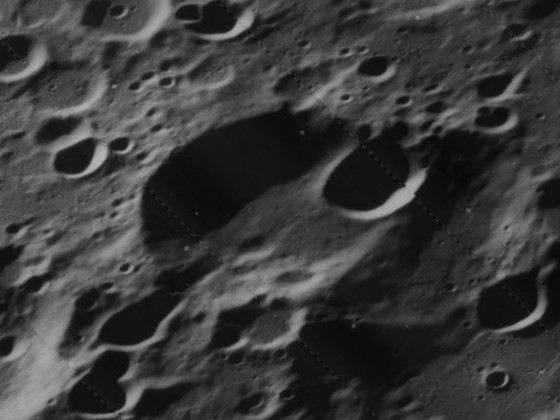
- Oblique Lunar Orbiter 5 image, facing west
- Coordinates: 32.8°N 110.5°W
- Diameter: 38 km
- Depth: Unknown
- Colongitude: 111° at sunrise
- Eponym: Roy Healy

Healy is a lunar impact crater that lies past the northwestern limb of the Moon, on the far side relative to the Earth. It is located to the southeast of the walled plain named Landau, and west of Lorentz, another walled plain. The rim of Healy is only slightly worn, but a small crater lies across the northeastern side. The inner walls and interior floor are relatively featureless, with no impacts of note.

== Satellite craters ==
By convention these features are identified on lunar maps by placing the letter on the side of the crater midpoint that is closest to Healy.

Healy	Latitude	Longitude	Diameter
J	30.2° N	108.8° W	42 km
N	30.9° N	110.8° W	42 km
