= Cuthbert Hely =

English lutenist and composer

Cuthbert Hely was an English lutenist and composer who was active during the first half of the 17th century.

== Life ==
Nothing so far is known about his life. It may be assumed, though, that Hely was taught to play the lute by musicians of John Dowland's generation. If so, Cuthbert Hely may have been born around 1570.

It was believed that Hely may have been Lord Herbert's lute teacher and that he was the compiler of Lord Herbert's lute book. Both these points seem unlikely, though, as Lord Herbert, by his own account, learned the lute around 1603 "with very little or no teaching," and Hely's contributions to Lord Herbert's lute book are only found in the hand of "Scribe C," whose entries are the latest in the manuscript, datable to 1639-1640.

It is uncertain if the composer is identical with a certain Cuthbert Hely who lived in Ludlow, England, during this era.

== Works ==
Eight compositions by Cuthbert Hely - four fantasias, three preludes, and a sarabande - are to be found in the lute book owned by Edward, Lord Herbert of Cherbury. Only one other work of Cuthbert Hely has been known so far, an air in four parts found in GB-Lbl Add.18940, a manuscript source dated to about 1650.

Although only a few works have survived, Cuthbert Hely's music is an example of 17th-century English lute music at its summit, attempting to bring Elizabethan "Golden Age" practices into the first phase of the Baroque era. His intensive and sometimes strongly melancholy style is carried over from the work of earlier composers such as John Dowland.

== Edition ==
- Hely, Cuthbert (1993). Eight Pieces for the Ten-Course Lute. Edited and transcribed by Matthew Spring. The Lute Society Music Editions. Albury, Guildford, England: The Lute Society. ISBN 0-905655-04-4.

== Literature ==
- R.T. Dart: ‘Lord Herbert of Cherbury’s Lute Book’, ML, xxxviii (1957), 136-48
- C.A. Price: ‘An Organisational Peculiarity of Lord Herbert of Cherbury’s Lutebook’, LSJ, xi (1969), 5-27
- J. Craig-McFeely: ‘A Can of Worms: Lord Herbert of Cherbury’s Lute Book’, ‘Inventory of Lord Herbert of Cherbury’s Lute Book’, LSJ, xxxi (1991), 20-35, 36-48
- M.G. Spring: ‘Solo Music for Tablature Instruments’, The Blackwell History of Music in Britain, iii: The Seventeenth Century, ed. I. Spink (Oxford, 1992), 381-4
