= Roy Healy =

Roy Healy (1915-1968) was an American Rocket scientist. He supervised the installation of rocket launchers on fighter planes in Burma during World War II. He was the vice president of the American Rocket Society. Healy Crater on the moon is named after him. Healy produced many pieces of academic literature relating to rocket science, as well as contributed information on rockets and jet propulsion that were valuable to the United States Military.

== Early life ==
Healy began experimenting with rockets when he was 12 years old. He studied at Casey Jones Technical School.

== Career ==
In 1938 he worked for Brewster Aviation Company and American Airlines. In 1943 he was hired by the Air Material Command at Wright Field to work on rockets. Working at Wright Field led to him being sent to military bases near Burma to work on installing rockets in planes and guide people on how to use them.

From 1946-1953, Healy worked at the M.W. Kellogg Co. of Jersey City, N.J.. Healy's work with Kellogg consisted of working on Rocket Boosters, rocket test equipment, and the design of engines and boosters. In 1953, Healy began work at North American Aviation, working on the rocket engine for the Redstone Missile. In 1955, Healy worked as a senior research engineer at the newly formed North American Rocketdyne division.

== Achievements ==
Healy guided the North American Jupiter engine program. He contributed to many World War II rocket installations. In 1946, he was named vice president of the American Rocket Society. The American Rocket Society was a group committed to the research and development of jets and rockets. A 23.9 kilometer crater on the moon was named after Healy, now titled Healy Crater. He was a key contributor to research on rockets and jet propulsion throughout his life. Healy's research and insight provided valuable information on rockets and jet propulsion that could be used for military purposes.

== Notable Publications ==
As a rocket scientist, Roy Healy wrote articles and had them published in various publications. Many of them pertained to rocket power and use during World War II.

- "Thrust of Powder Rocket Charges: Commercial Types Tested", published in 1941. Healy is describing data and research on different types of rockets.
- "The Nazi Rocket Threat: Giant Projectiles Awaiting Invasion", published in 1944. Healy writes to warn of the threat posed by Nazi rockets. He is arguing that the story posed about the Nazi's having rockets prepared and ready to launch is true, and any skepticism should be eliminated.
- "Nazi Rocket Weapons: Jet Power Widely Used by Germany" published in 1943. The article is about different types of jet power and rockets used by Nazi Germany during World War II.
- "The Black Powder Rocket Charge: Its Military Uses" published in 1942. Healy discusses types of rockets used during the first world war, and then progresses to discuss more modern types of rockets for the time period.
