= Lewis Cave =

British judge (1832–1897)

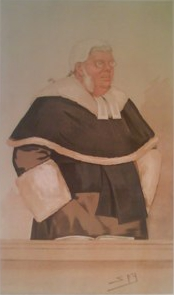
"That won't do you know" Cave as caricatured by Spy (Leslie Ward) in Vanity Fair, December 1893

Sir Lewis William Cave (3 July 1832 – 7 September 1897) was a British judge on the Queen's Bench during the reign of Queen Victoria.

== Biography ==
He was born in Desborough, Northamptonshire, the eldest son of William Cave, a local landowner, and his wife, Elizabeth. After attending Rugby School, he went to Lincoln College, Oxford, from where he graduated in 1855 with a degree in humanities.

Shortly after graduating, Cave started studying law, and married Julia Watkins, the daughter of the vicar of Brixworth on 5 August 1856. Cave was called to the bar on 10 June 1859 and built up a large general practice in the English Midlands.

In 1873 he was appointed Recorder of Lincoln, Lincolnshire, and two years later became a Queen's Counsel. He edited several legal texts, including Stone's Practice of Petty Sessions (1861), Reports of the Court for the Consideration of Crown Cases Reserved, Addison's Treatise on the Law of Contracts (1869; 1875) and Addison's Law of Torts (1879).

Despite being well known in the Midlands, Cave was not well known in London. His appointment as a Justice of the Queen's Bench in 1881, and his coincident knighthood, came as something of a surprise.

As a judge, he gained a reputation as bluff and concise, often cutting short arguments which he considered too lengthy. However, at the major trial of the poisoner Kate Dover at Leeds Winter Assizes in 1882, his summing-up took one hour.
