= Kate Dover =

English artist and murderer

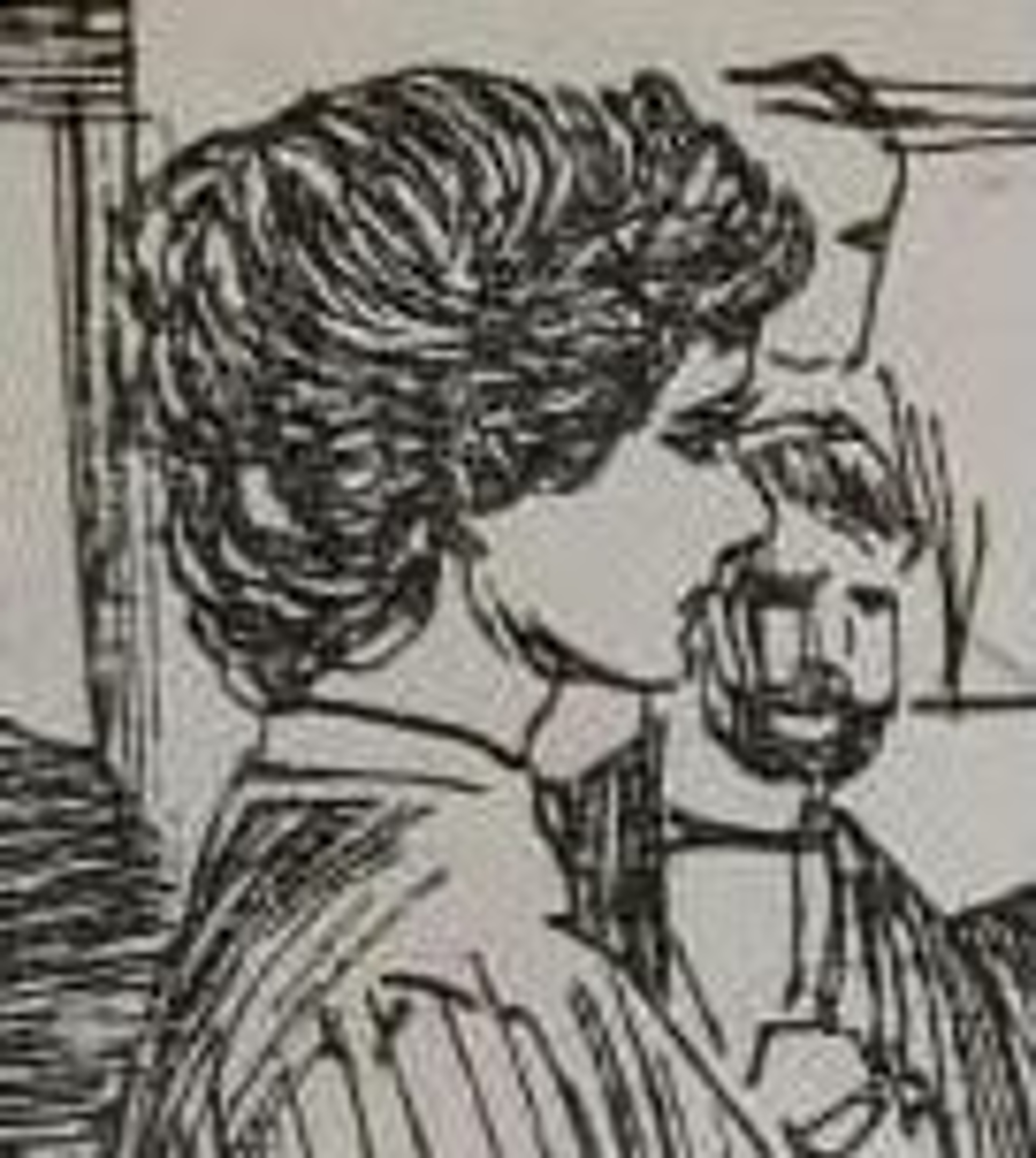
- Courtroom drawing of Dover, 1882
- Born: Felicia Dorothea Kate Dover; 1855; Sheffield, United Kingdom
- Died: 26 March 1925 (aged 69); Rotherham, United Kingdom
- Occupation: Housekeeper
- Employer: Thomas Skinner
- Known for: Arsenic poisoning of employer
- Term: Life
- Conviction: Manslaughter
- Criminal charges: Murder
- Penalty: Penal servitude for life

Details
- Victims: Thomas Skinner
- Date: 6 December 1881
- Date apprehended: 18 December 1881
- Imprisoned at: Woking Female Prison; 11 February 1882; Released before 1901.

Felicia Dorothea Kate Dover (1855 – 26 March 1925) was an English woman who was tried for murder and convicted of manslaughter in 1882 following the death of Thomas Skinner from arsenic poisoning. She was trained as an artist at Sheffield School of Art and was skilled in drawing flowers. She was popularly known as the Queen of Heeley due to her artistic interests and her standard of dress.

In 1880, at age 25, she become the housekeeper of etcher Thomas Skinner, aged 61. Despite the difference in age, he was considered her "sweetheart" and said to be courting her "with a view to marrying her". In 1882, Kate Dover was tried for murder and convicted of manslaughter following the death of Skinner from arsenic poisoning. Her trial was a major event at the criminal court in Leeds Town Hall; it was attended by many people and attracted significant newspaper coverage.

Dover's counsel for the defence, Frank Lockwood, employed the "clever defence" of stating that she had given Skinner arsenic, but had not done so with a clear intent to kill him. Instead of being hanged for murder, she was sentenced to penal servitude for life. Her sentencing was in line with a trend against the use of the death penalty, in which the defendant's character was seen as relevant in determining sentences. Kate Dover served her sentence at Woking Female Prison, and was released by 1901. In her remaining years, she lived with her sisters at Rotherham, dying unmarried.

== Family background ==
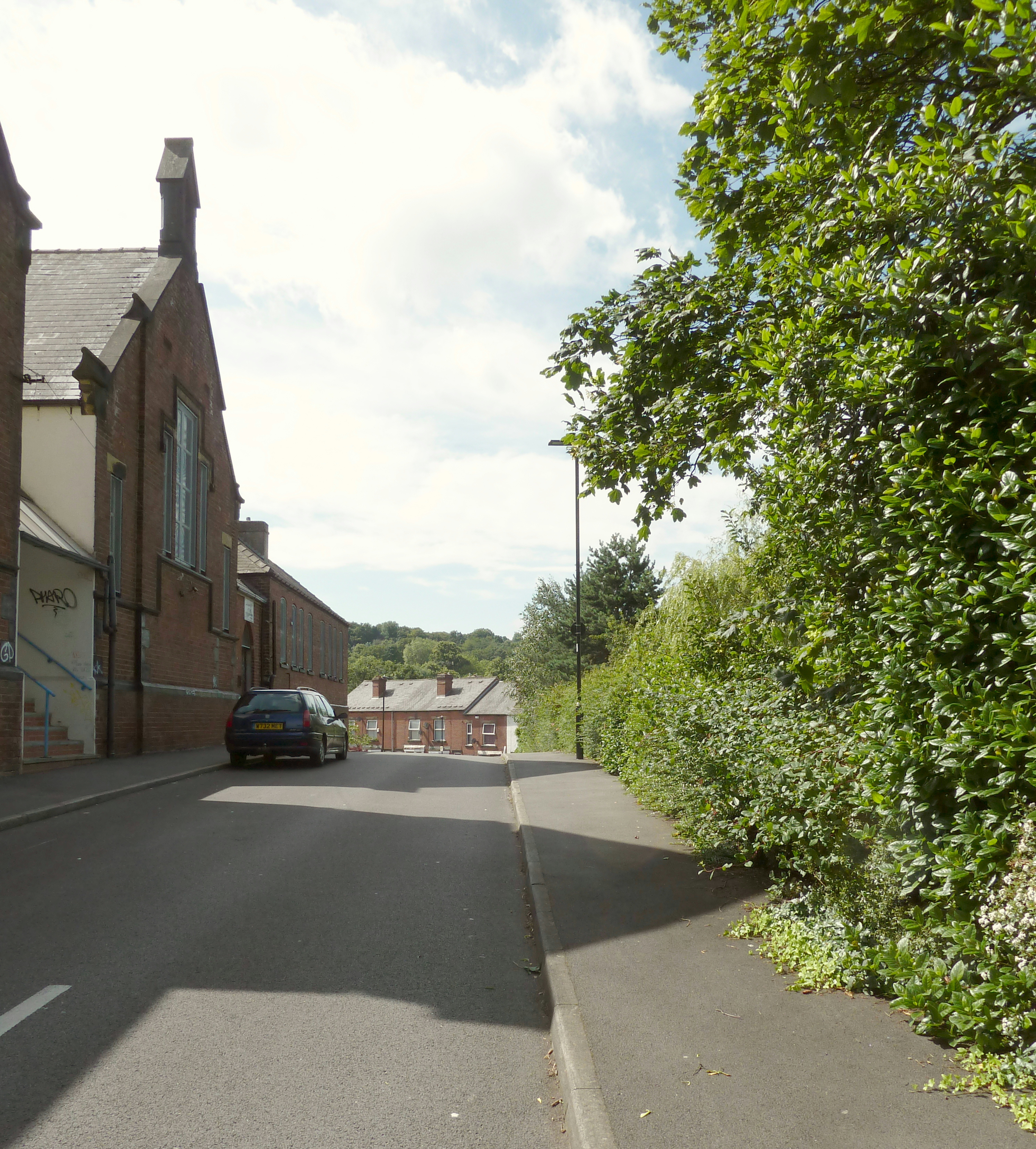
The trees on the right mark the former site of 4 Thirwell Terrace, Kate's home

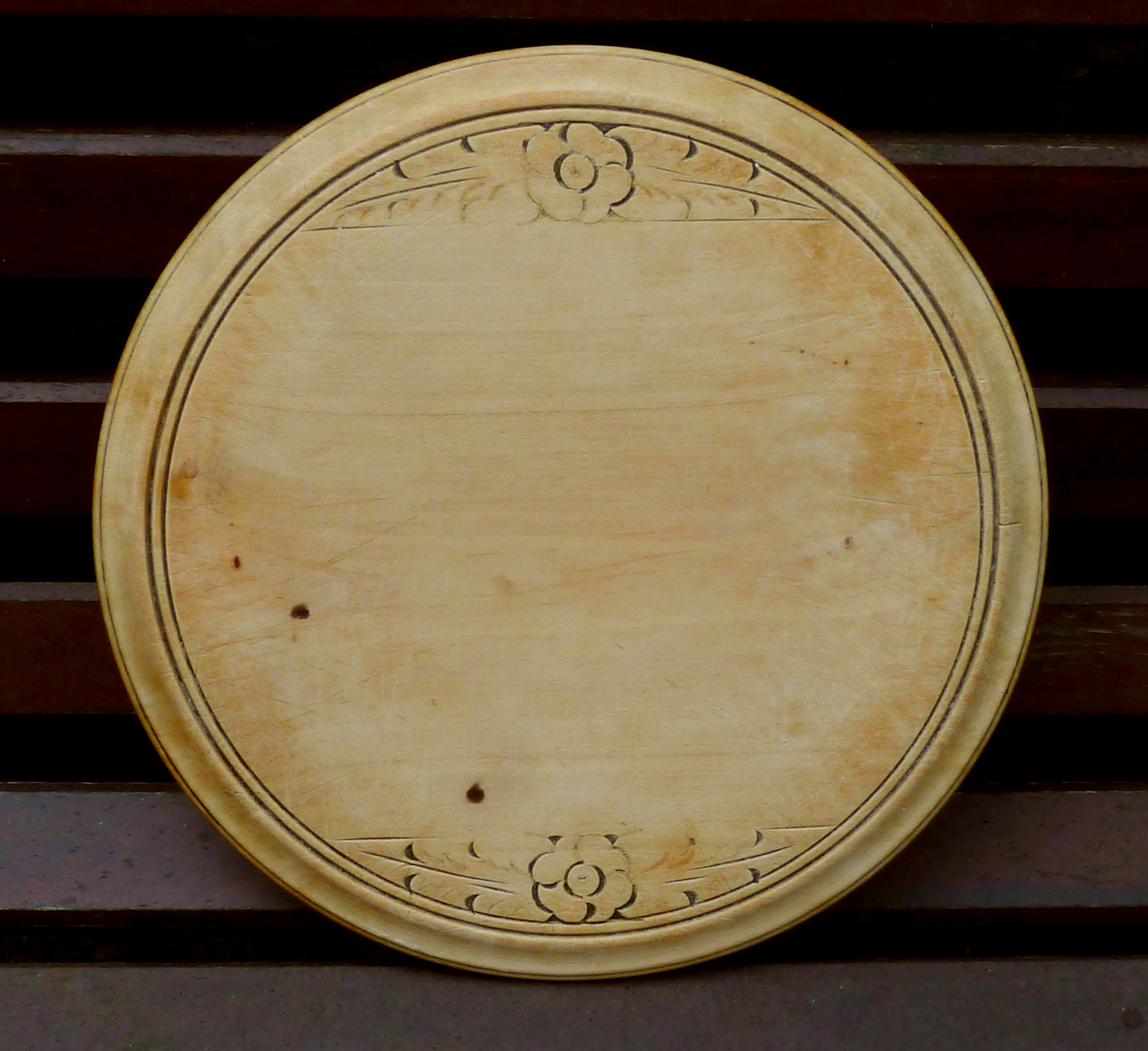
A bread platter of the type made in Sheffield in the 19th century

Kate's paternal grandparents were gardener George Dover (born Norwich ca.1798), and his wife Sarah (born Norwich ca.1802). Kate's father was Charles Dover (St Paul's, Norwich, 1826 – Eccleshall, 1891), the third of 10 siblings.

Charles was a wood carver and joiner who specialised in wooden platters. (Note: A bread and butter platter is a decorative antique version of a cutting board for bread, but was used primarily for offering bread and butter at table, and not so much for cutting it in the kitchen.) He was possibly associated with the wood carver, and bread and butter platter maker, Frederick William Dover (St Paul's, Norwich, ca. 1834 – Ecclesall, 1917) of Burgess Street, Ecclesall Bierlow, who shared the same trade and origins. The making of carved sycamore bread and butter platters and wooden knives had been introduced to Sheffield around 1851 by Prince Albert.

The Dover family, then, fit a pattern common to the Sheffield area. In 19th-century Sheffield, manufacturing in skilled trades such as wood carving was family-based: most family businesses were 'born small and remained small' and often employed both sons and daughters. The main industries of Sheffield focused around the production of iron and steel. Sheffield was a primary centre for cutlery, plate, and specialised tools, including woodworking tools. Sheffield also supported a well-established woodworking and furniture industry. By the end of the 19th century, however, carvers and gilders were losing work to mechanisation.

Charles Dover's place of business was Oak Street in Heeley in 1865. (Note: All 19th-century buildings in Oak Street, where Charles Dover might have worked, have since been demolished.) The Sheffield Daily Telegraph said of him that "there was not a more respectable man in the neighbourhood." Around 1880 Charles Dover published a "small volume of prose and poetry – not a little of it very meritorious indeed."

Kate's mother was Catharine Nunn (Snape, Suffolk, 1827 – Rotherham, 1894), daughter of Jonathan Nunn (Snape, ca. 1791 – Norwich, 1866), a candle rush manufacturer and later a grocer. Charles and Catharine married in Haslingden on 5 May 1846. Kate had two elder sisters: Mary Ann Sarah (Knightsbridge, 1848 – Rotherham, 1923) and Amelia Henrietta Charlotte (Sheffield 1851 – Rotherham 1918).

== Early life and education ==
In 1851, before Kate was born, the family was living at 29 Jessop Street, Sheffield. Kate Dover was born in Sheffield in 1855. From at least 1861 until 1883 the family was living at 4 Thirlwell Terrace, Heeley, Nether Hallam, Sheffield. (Note: Thirlwell Terrace was on Plantation Road, postcode S8 9TF. The side of the road containing no.4 was demolished, that side is now trees and grass, but the Wesleyan church on the other side of Plantation Road survives as a mosque. Plantation Road runs from Thirlwell Road to Albert Road, Heeley, Sheffield.) At the age of nine years, she wrote a "small book called God's Love."

As an adult, Kate was 5 ft 1.5 in (1.56 m) tall. She was a student of Sheffield School of Art, and many of her flower pictures showed "considerable merit". She professed herself to be a vegetarian and teetotaller. She was "a prominent member of the Good Templars", at the Excelsior Lodge, Sheffield.

She was known as the "Queen of Heeley", due to her taste in cosmetics and paints, and her liking for fashionable clothes. "The keynote to her character [was] extreme excitability ..." Before her appointment with Skinner, "she was accustomed to dress well, and sometimes with a good deal of taste; and she came to be popularly known as the Heeley Queen," but by the end of their acquaintance her clothes had "become very shabby".

== Employment ==
In 1880, Dover was managing a confectioner's shop, or a spice shop, in London Road, Sheffield.

In autumn 1880, she became housekeeper to widower Thomas Skinner (1819–1881) of Sheffield, who was a well-to-do inventor, etcher, and painter. Skinner may have taught her his trade, as he had done with his previous housekeeper. It is not known whether he used her drawing talent as an asset in his designing processes, although etched flower designs were used on cutlery.

== Crime and trial ==
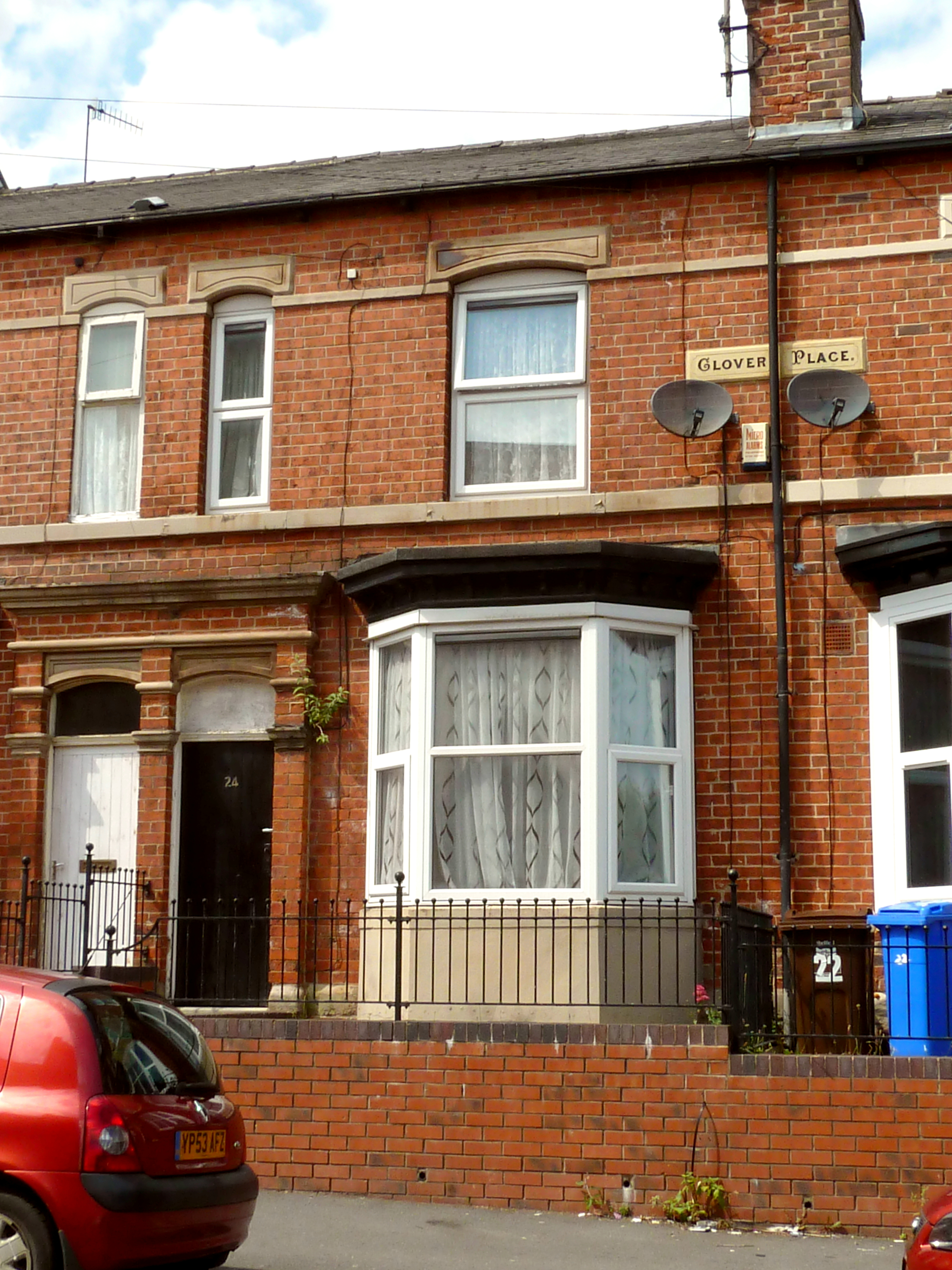
24 Glover Place, where the crime occurred

On 6 December 1881, Dover killed her employer and "sweetheart", Skinner, by cooking him a roast dinner with arsenic in the stuffing. Dover and Skinner had had a turbulent relationship, and Skinner's former housekeeper Jane Jones disapproved of Dover's behaviour in the house, and may also have disapproved of their plans to marry.

At her trial, which took place in Leeds Town Hall before Mr Justice Cave, Dover's counsel for the defence, Frank Lockwood, employed a "clever defence". He argued that Dover had nothing to gain, but, on the contrary, everything to lose by the death of Skinner. He suggested that Dover's motive for the poisoning might not have been to kill, but to make Skinner ill and blame Jones for it, thereby undoing the influence of the objector to the marriage.

=== The importance of character ===
Her sentencing was contentious, but it was also in line with a trend against the use of the death penalty, in which the defendant's character was often taken into account in determining sentences.

She was a working-class but well-educated artist in an industrial town, with the virtues of regular employment, temperance and an attractive and fashionable appearance. Her demonstrated artistic and letter-writing skills suggested that she was intelligent.

At the same time, she was apparently ignorant of the potential effect of up to an ounce of arsenic in a dish of onion stuffing, and ignorant of the amount of arsenic which might safely produce only harmless symptoms. Moreover, she did not attempt to find out either of these things. No evidence was shown regarding any plans for the outcome of her use of arsenic, should Thomas Skinner become ill or should he die, and when Skinner appeared to be dying she panicked. The Court case did offer explanations and gave a pronouncement on some of these matters.

Other aspects of her character were also described in ways that were inconsistent or contradictory. Before the crime, she was a regular member of a temperance society and there is no suggestion that she ever drank alcohol. Yet she was apparently content to obey her employer's instructions to supply his daily requirement of ale, and to meet him willingly in a public house, a type of place which respectable women did not enter alone at that time.

She went home from the house of her "old sweetheart", Skinner, to her parents every night, apparently leading a socially respectable life. Yet others criticised actions such as "sitting on Mr Skinner's knee" as lewd and inappropriate.

Her honesty was questionable. She told untruths when purchasing the arsenic, saying that she planned to use it for colouring artificial flowers. She may also have allowed her mother to perjure herself in court on her behalf.

=== Verdict and sentence ===
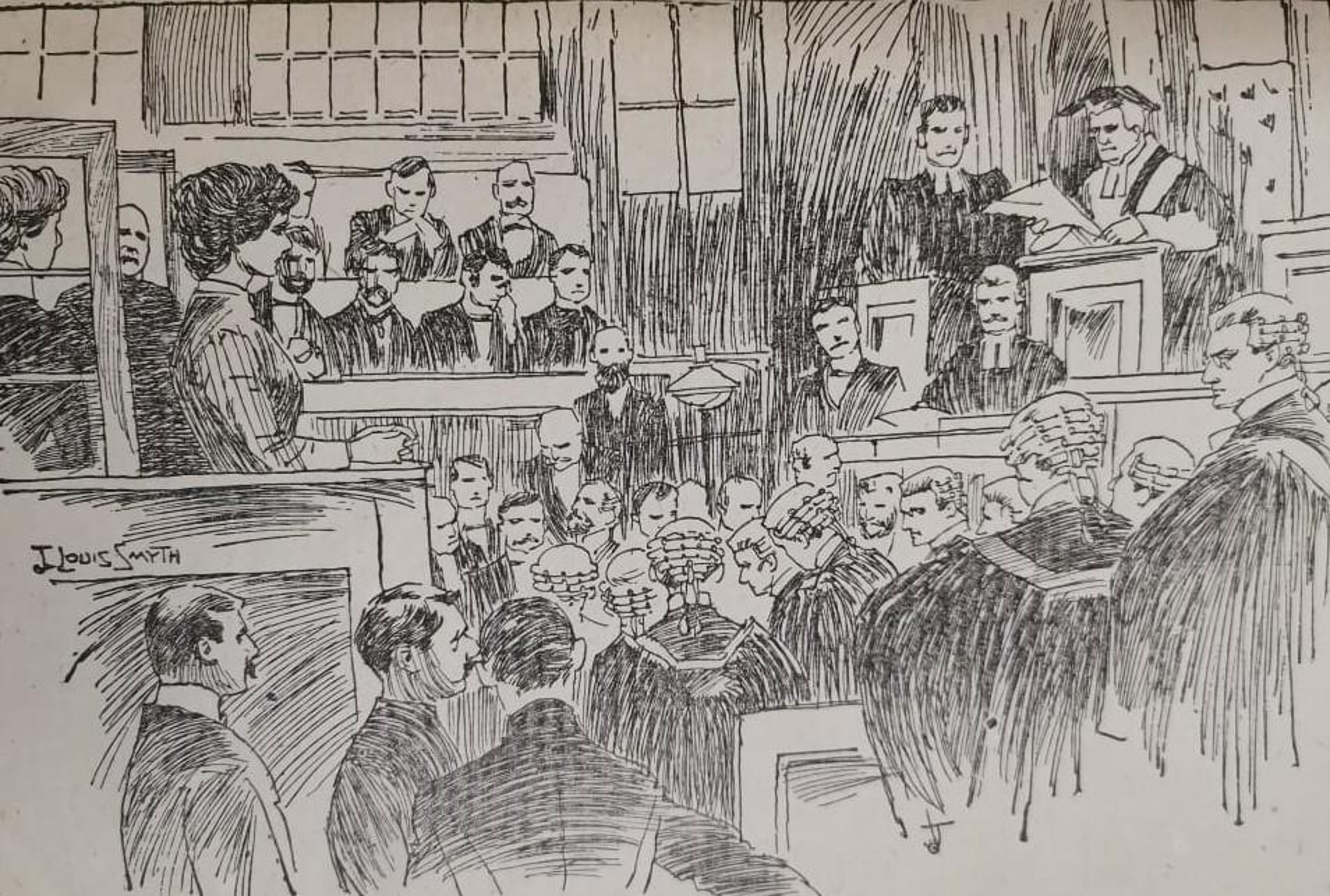
Courtroom drawing, showing Dover and Justice Cave

Lockwood was successful in convincing the jury to view Kate Dover sympathetically. The jury returned a verdict convicting Dover of manslaughter because intention to murder could not be proved, rather than murder. This result was considered to be "surprising".

The jury was criticized in Gideon's Law Notes for its "extraordinary conduct"; both the "influence of the eloquence of counsel" and the attractiveness of the defendant were suggested to have "blind[ed] the jury as to their duty". It was stated that Kate Dover "was goodlooking and young, and the jury, taking a merciful view of a very strong case of poisoning, found her guilty of manslaughter only."

When determining her sentence, Mr Justice Cave expressed his clear disagreement with the jury's decision, by giving her the most severe possible sentence, penal servitude for life. It was stated in the British Medical Journal that "Coupling the sentence with the verdict, the conclusion is irresistible, that the judge thought the jury had taken a very lenient view of the matter." He described her actions in as follows:

Kate Dover, the jury adopted a view which was presented to them by your learned counsel, and they found you guilty of manslaughter; but the circumstances of your offence are so grave and so atrocious that they are separated but by a very thin line from the offence of murder. In such circumstances I must pass upon you the heaviest sentence in my power, and that is that you be kept in penal servitude for the term of your natural life."

== Imprisonment and remaining years ==
Dover served her sentence at Woking Female prison. She was released some time after 1895. After leaving prison, or at least by 1901, Kate lived with her sister Mary and her brother-in-law Edwin Sissons, a baker-confectioner, at 19 Carlton Avenue, Rotherham. By 1911, Kate had moved and was living at 423 Badsley Moor Lane, Rotherham, with her widowed sister Amelia H.C. Eden.

Kate Dover never married. She died aged 69 years on 26 March 1925, of bronchitis and heart failure, at 25 St Ann's Road, Rotherham. She had been living there with her widowed brother-in-law Edward Sissons, who was in attendance at her death. She was buried on 29 March 1925 at Masbrough Cemetery, Kimberworth, West Riding of Yorkshire.
