= Healy device =

Pseudoscientific device

The Healy is a pseudoscientific device designed by Marcus Schmieke and Nuno Nina, that claims to function via bioresonance to enhance overall health. The device has been promoted via influencer marketing and multi-level marketing, while sellers make extreme healing claims without any proven benefits.

== Description ==
Energy medicine devices are a class of pseudoscientific devices that originated with the work of Royal Rife, claiming to work via transferring energy to a person's energy field. The Healy claims to work using electricity to find a user's "personalized frequencies", an idea that has no scientific backing or mechanism.

== Criticism ==
=== Lack of scientific evidence ===
Critics of the Healy device, such as David H. Gorski, have highlighted the lack of scientific rigor behind the machine. Gorski argues that there is no good evidence to support the claim that injured tissue takes on a “different vibrational characteristic.” He strongly criticizes the belief in a mystical “life energy” that does no work and is undetectable by scientific instruments.

=== Disclaimers and misleading claims ===
Stephen Barrett has noted that many of Healy's marketing materials carry disclaimers stating that “Healy and its applications are not acknowledged by orthodox medicine due to a lack of scientific proof in accordance with scientific standards.” However, Barrett points out that the claims for the Healy are not just unproven, but there is no logical reason to believe that the “frequencies” described are actual physical forces.

=== Marketing tactics ===
The Healy has been criticized for its marketing tactics, particularly the use of influencer marketing and multi-level marketing schemes. These strategies have been seen as a way to promote the device despite its lack of proven benefits. The Office for Science and Society describes the Healy as a “triumph of marketing” due to its claims of using personalized frequencies, which make its claims “unfalsifiable.”

=== Placebo effect ===
David R. Stukus, in an interview with Rolling Stone, commented that any research conducted by the company supporting Healy's efficacy is likely the result of the placebo effect.
