= Beaver Falls Cutlery Company =

Former cutlery company in Pennsylvania

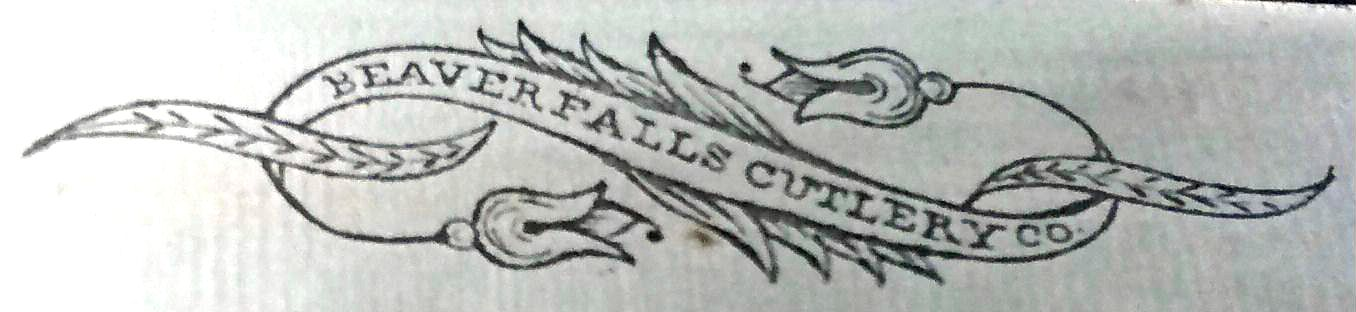
- Type: Joint-stock company
- Industry: Steel cutlery manufacture
- Predecessor: Binns & Mason; Pittsburgh Cutlery Company
- Founded: 1866; 160 years ago
- Founder: Edward Binns; Samuel Mason
- Defunct: 1886; 140 years ago
- Headquarters: Beaver Falls, Pennsylvania, United States
- Area served: International trade
- Products: Steel cutlery, razors, pocket knives
- Owners: E. Binns and S. Mason 1866–1867; Harmony Society 1867–1886
- Number of employees: 300

Beaver Falls Cutlery Company manufactured steel cutlery, razors, and pocketknives from 1866 to 1886 in Pennsylvania.

The company was founded as Binns & Mason by skilled cutlers from Sheffield, West Riding of Yorkshire, England, as a small enterprise making pocketknives in Rochester, Pennsylvania. It briefly became The Pittsburgh Cutlery Company, then was purchased in 1867 by the Harmony Society and moved to Beaver Falls. It was outfitted mass production, employing 300 people on a two-acre site. In 1872, owners and workers had a labor dispute that was resolved by the employment of up to 225 Chinese workers. In 1876, it produced the "largest knife and fork in the world", for display at the Centennial Exposition. The company closed in 1886.

== Founding ==
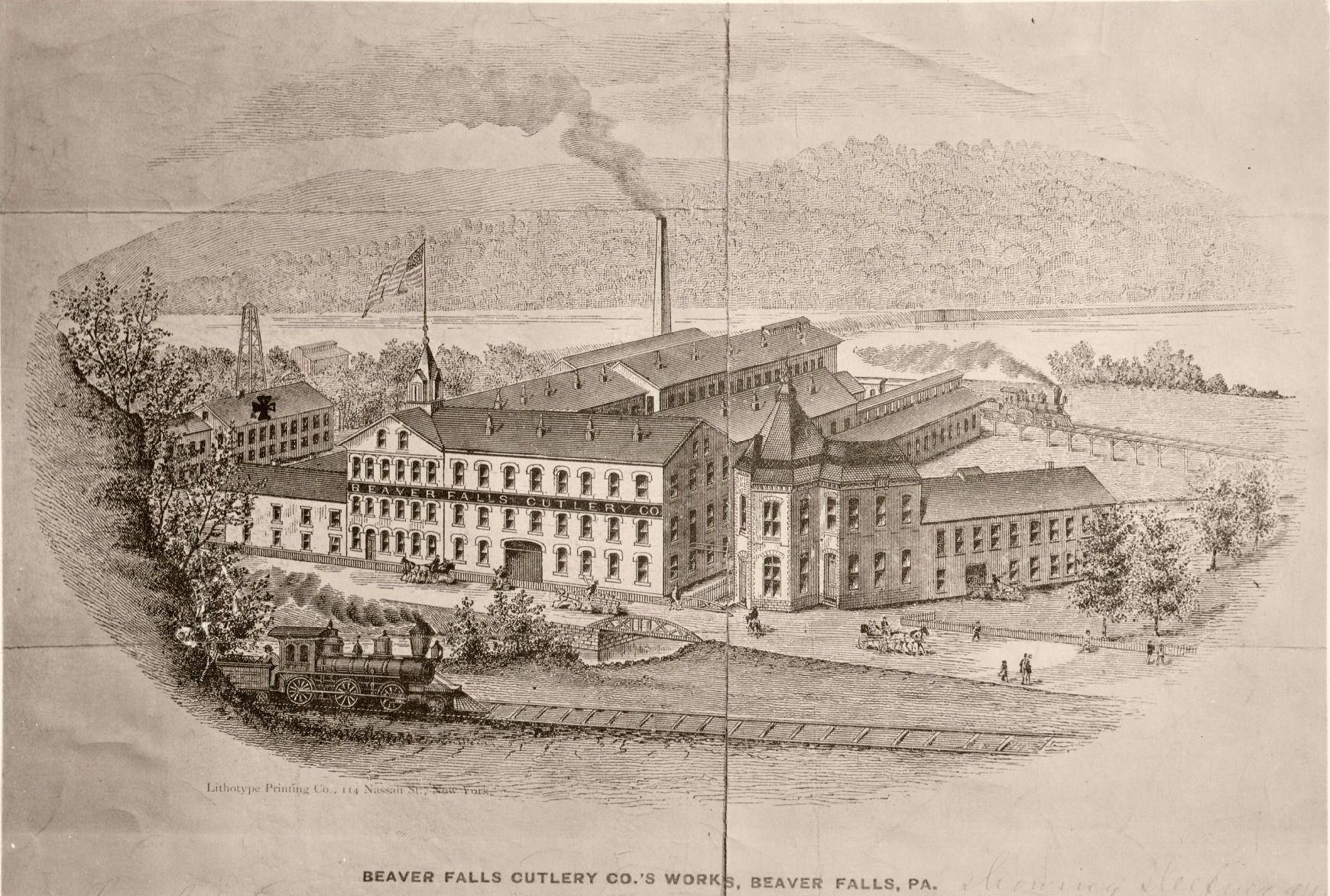
Beaver Falls Cutlery Works, 1867

=== Samuel Mason ===
Samuel Mason, one of the founders of the company, was born in Sheffield, West Yorkshire, England, around 1812. His wife was Jane Mason (b.ca.1820), and they had two sons born in England. The second son was Henry (b.ca.1842). On 30 March 1844 Mason left for America with his family, arriving in New York "pennyless (sic) and friendless" after a journey of 105 days. He remained in America for 31 years, becoming an American citizen in 1860, and returning to Sheffield in 1875. His first American employment in 1844 was with William Wild who had previously manufactured cutlery in Sheffield. In November of that year he obtained work with a cutlery manufacturer in Connecticut. He does not say where he was working between 1844 and 1866, but his highly detailed description of the mass production at Lamson and Goodnow's Cutlery works at Shelburne Falls, founded by Lamson in 1844, implies personal experience of the place. Mason and his wife had two more sons in Massachusetts: William (b.ca.1844) and Joseph (b.ca.1846), so it is possible that Mason was recruited to Lamson and Goodnow when the company was founded.

The Beaver Falls Courier (1875–1879) wrote that in 1866 Binns and Mason established the company, whose capital, it said, was then $1 million. It continued: "A few years ago the spot which is now occupied by the town was a barren and desolated tract of land. The upper part was a forest, within whose rocky barriers scarcely a house was seen."

Mason was director of Binns & Mason for three years between 1866 and 1869. When he and Binns started the company, recruitment of skilled workers from their home town of Sheffield was facilitated by the Sheffield Outrages. That was the term for the strife between cutlers and management due to cramped and dangerous conditions. It also described the murder of some non-union workers in 1854 from which worker unrest escalated into the blowing up of houses with gunpowder in 1866. Following Harmony's takeover, Mason continued at Beaver Falls Cutlery Company as superintendent of cutlery. In 1870, his three younger sons Henry, William and Joseph were also working at the plant as foreman, machinist and worker respectively. In that year his personal estate was valued at $5,000.

Mason was against slavery, and said on the subject: "I gave my first son, who for four years combated the enemy on the battlefield. I am not sorry for the act." (Note: Mason's son who died in the American Civil War was possibly George Mason (born Sheffield, England, 1839) of the Massachusetts Regiment) In 1875 he returned to Sheffield where he lived at 120 Westbar, and by 1876 was regularly writing letters to English newspapers on the subject of cutlery manufacture in America, and on the virtues of trade protectionism by America. In 1875 Mason became a boot and shoe dealer, running the American Shoe Store at 120 Westbar, Sheffield. On 11 June 1879 he filed a petition for bankruptcy, having liabilities of £800. His date of death is unknown, however there was a meeting of his creditors on 1 July 1879, declaring his debts of £537 14s 6d, and assets of £91 11s.

== Growth ==
By 13 October 1866, Binns & Mason was a chartered company. It lacked capital and needed investors from Pittsburgh, so it consequently became the Pittsburgh Cutlery Company. The investment was insufficient, so the Pittsburgh Cutlery Company was merged with the Harmony Society's new firm, which was based at Ambridge. The Harmony Society had already bought the town of Beaver Falls in 1849. At this point, Henry Reeves became president while Samuel Mason was still director, and John Reeves was secretary and treasurer. In April 1867 the knife-making business was moved to a two-acre site at Beaver Falls, PA, in "the lower end of town, near the river," where 300 people were eventually employed (following another recruitment drive in Sheffield, England) making it one of the largest companies of its day. It was later called the "cutlery property," because Harmony expanded it to make table cutlery besides other knives. The factory complex was founded in 1868 between Second Street and Third Street, off Seventh Avenue. (Note: The initial four or five BFCC buildings were two or three stories high, covering over 100,000 square feet of floor space, but they no longer exist.) By early 1868 the firm's name was Beaver Falls Cutlery Company.

The organizers of the 1867 expansion were Pittsburgh men: Dr C.G. Hussey, General Thomas M. Howe and James W. Brown. (Note: In 1904 Brown was a member of Congress) The majority of shares were purchased by the Harmony Society, and it became a joint-stock company with a capital stock of $400,000 in 1870, under the leadership of John Reeves. The Harmony Society had been successful manufacturers, but their numbers had declined, and they were becoming business investors instead. "At its peak (the works) employed 300 workers who turned out 1200 dozen finished products per day." In 1876, Samuel Mason described the company: "The ... Company when in full blast run three turbine water wheels of 82-horse power each, and one engine 125-horse power, so you may calculate the amount of cutlery turned out by this firm." He mentions that America was making steel cutlery while Sheffield was still using iron.

== Labor dispute, 1872 ==
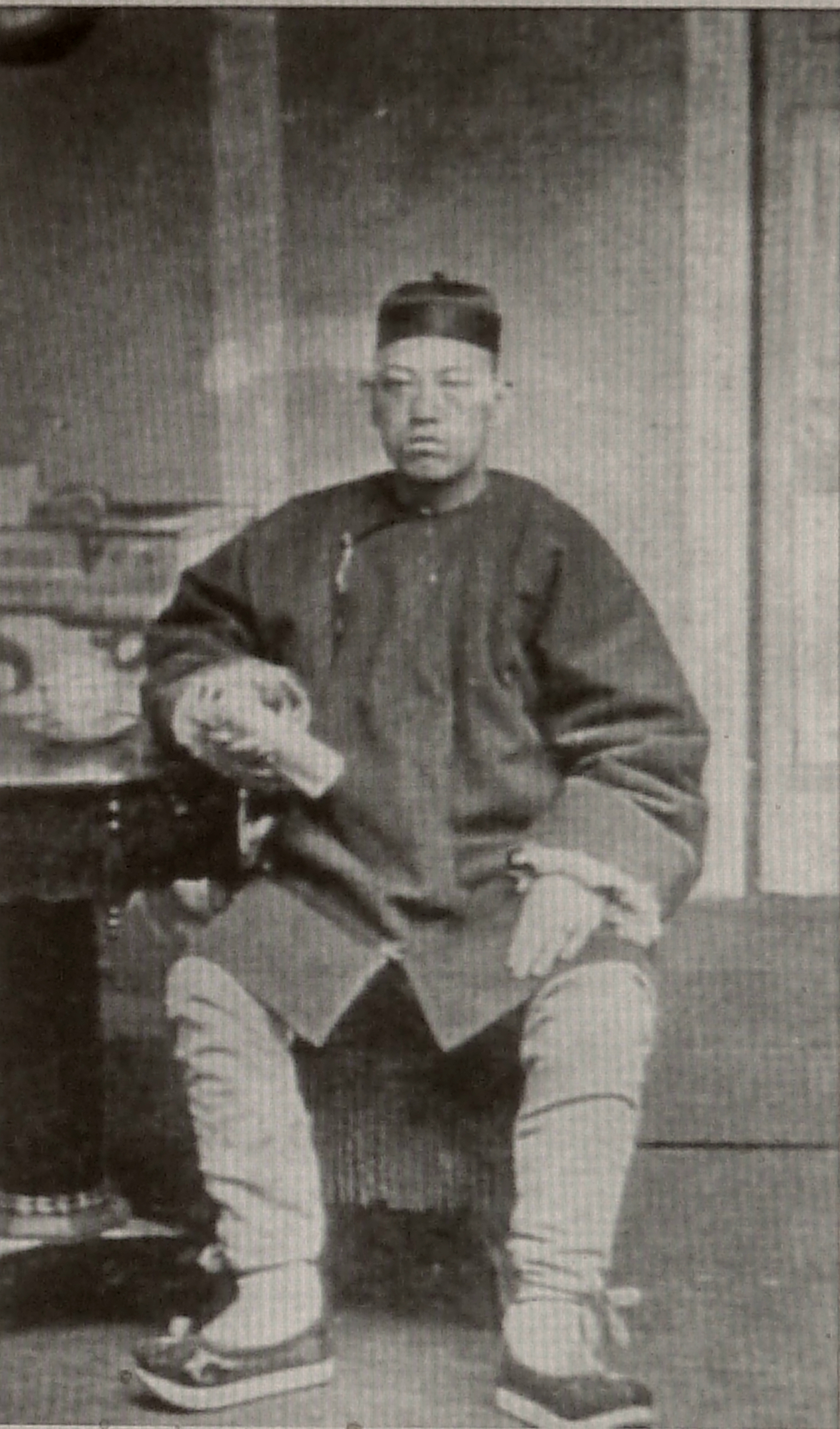
Chinese cutlery worker, 1870s

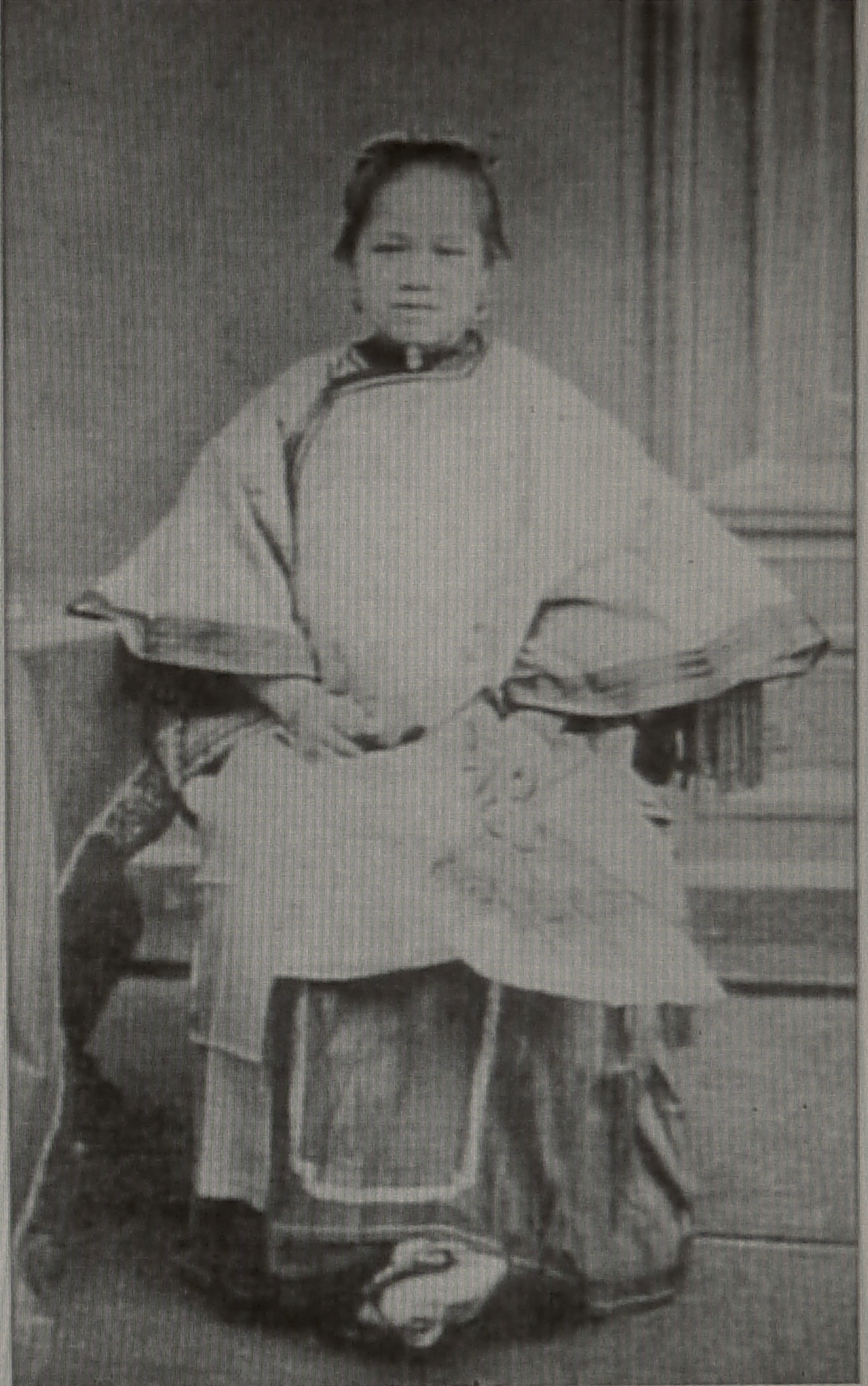
Madam Chow, 1870s

In 1872 the company was stable and Harmony was making a profit. At this point the largely English skilled workforce took the opportunity to initiate a labor dispute and strike for higher wages. The director John Reeves refused the demand. Instead he closed the factory, then he gave a five-year contract to 225 Chinese workers gradually brought in from California and New Orleans. With them was Madam Chow, the wife of Chow Hung and the only Chinese woman at Beaver Falls at that time. The Beaver County Times has suggested that it was she who brought the antique manuscript of Dream of the Red Chamber which was discovered at Beaver Falls in 2019. Reeves brought in the Chinese with some difficulty, travelling for fifteen days to San Francisco to find only reluctant travelers, then riding the new railroad to New Orleans to gratefully collect his first seventy Chinese men who had been working on the railway. Another thirty men followed them to Beaver Falls the following week. A further influence in this matter was the Methodist minister Reverend Dyer, a missionary who knew that the Chinese worked hard and did not drink.

It was not an easy transition though. The Chinese were met off the train by an angry mob of workers, and saloon keepers who had discovered that the Chinese did not drink. The local policeman, assisted by John Reeves and Judge Henry Hice, had to keep order for some weeks. The Chinese workers resided in The Old Mansion House, built in 1875 with a cookhouse, dining room and sleeping quarters, at the corner of Third Street and Seventh Avenue. The contract for the Chinese workers was with San Francisco merchant Ah Chuck, who had the responsibility of returning their bodies to China should they die in American employ. The contract provided for rice, sleeping quarters and a gold dollar a day for each man. Ah Chuck also provided an interpreter, Lee Ten Pay.

At first there was a settlement with the company workers, following a delegation from the Beaver Falls community. Management agreed as follows: "All cutlery workers were paid each month with the privilege of leaving if dissatisfied, and if they would leave the Chinamen alone and permit them to remain, the strikers would be reinstated with pay and all profits from the cutlery would be used for the community for seven years." The Chinese were satisfactory workers; their appearance attracted tourists who in turn brought good custom to the factory.

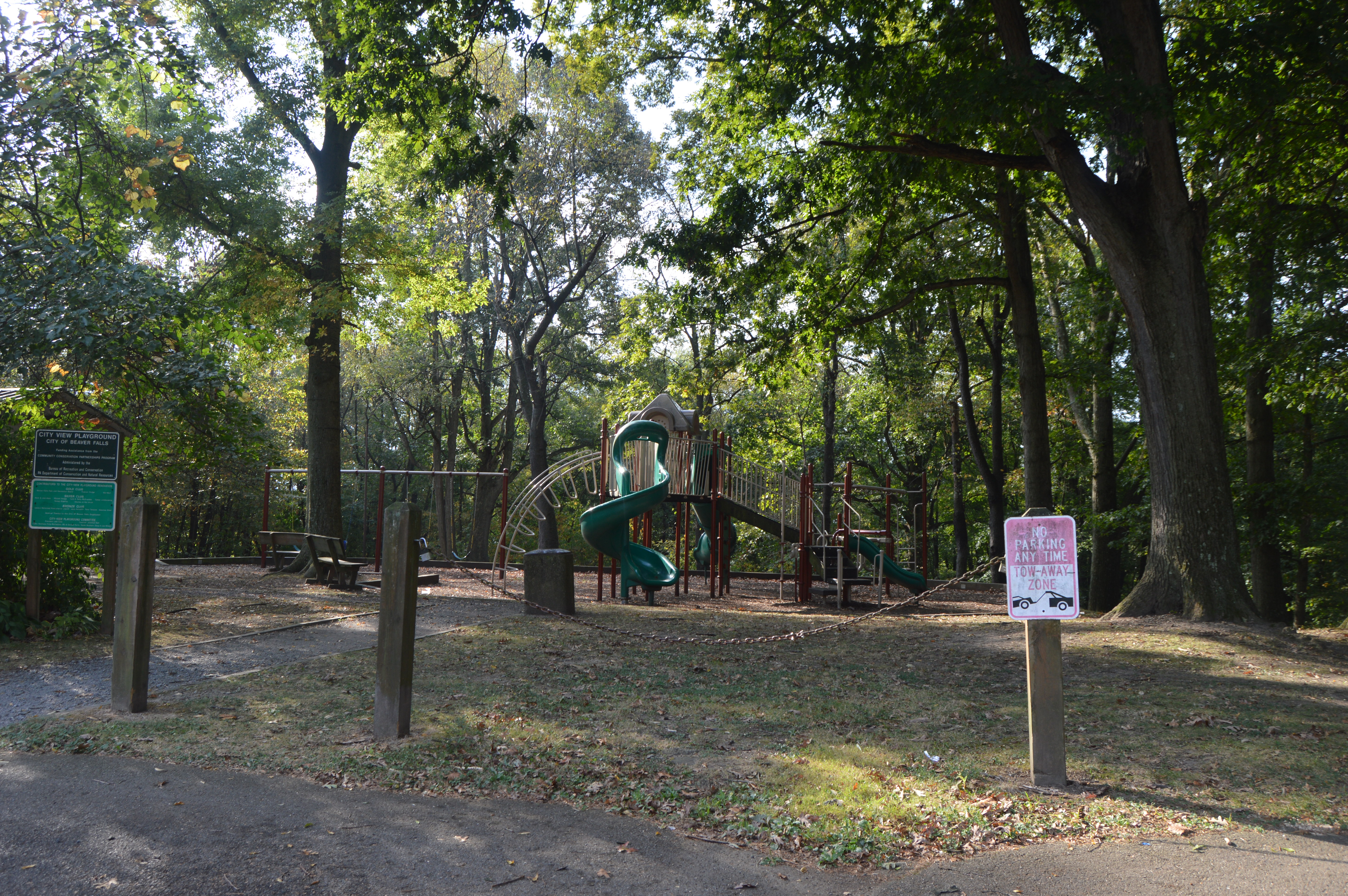
City View Playground in College Hill, formerly the Chinese cemetery

However the Chinese had been brought in to reduce theft and to reduce the payroll. The payroll dropped from $13,000 to $5,000 per month. Beaver Falls residents resented the Chinese, pushing them from the wooden walkways onto the muddy streets. Some Chinese workers died after such attacks, and were buried at the far end of town in a specially dedicated cemetery, near Twenty-Eighth Street and Fifth Avenue on College Hill. Their bones were then "removed and carried away in sacks." Although rumor had it that a mysterious benefactor paid for the removal of the bodies, which were exhumed and returned to China for traditional burial rites, another story suggests that a developer wanted to build homes on the land. Over the years, half of the Chinese left the company, and in 1877 the other half left, their fare to San Francisco being paid by the company, as per their contract. Local residents returned to work at the plant.

The background to the use of Chinese labor was the immigration of 60,000 Chinese to the Pacific Coast and Rockies between the California Gold Rush and 1869. With the completion of the First transcontinental railroad in 1869, the Chinese began to move east, and potential employment at Beaver Falls made it one of their first eastern destinations. The local controversy following the strike at the cutlery company took the notice of Pennsylvania General Assembly and Congress, in the context of the contemporary Chinese question debate about immigration. "In some measure it contributed to the eventual passage of the Chinese Exclusion Act" of 1882.

== Decline ==
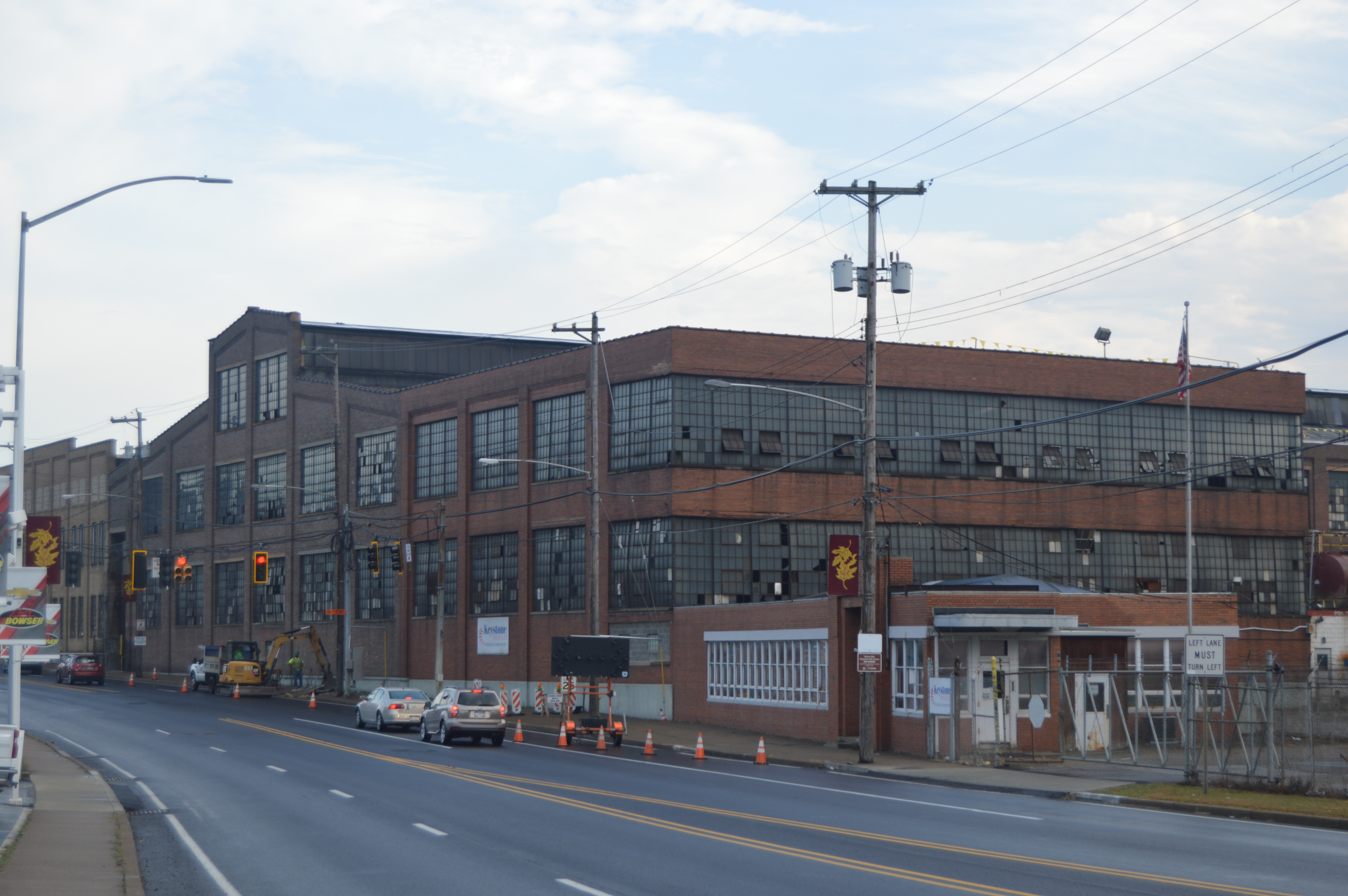
Former Cutlery Company site, now redeveloped, 2019

In 1876, the Sheffield Daily Telegraph wrote of the company's symbol at the factory:

"The trade mark of the company is one of the finest pieces of carving in wood we have seen, yet it is only typical of the trades of the Company. There is represented the American eagle flapping its wings in triumph over the British lion, and the latter is struggling in the last agonies of death. So the English manufacturers of cutlery have been supplanted in their trade by American establishments ... Then in addition to the trade in Europe the trade in this country is very great. The works are continually pressed for orders."

The company gradually declined from 1877 to 1886 when it could no longer make a profit and was closed. In 1890 the Champlin family purchased the knife-making equipment to start up their Cattaraugus Cutlery Company in Little Valley, New York. The Beaver Falls Cutlery Company buildings were subsequently occupied by the Metric Metal Works, The Eclipse Bicycle Company, The McCool Tube Company, the New York Pittsburgh Company, The Shelby Steel Tube Company and the Beaver Falls Car Works.

== Products ==
=== Tableware and various knives ===
The company produced "all kinds of knives and tableware ... These products ranged from finely crafted bone-handled knives to an austere, but sturdy wood-handled utensil. The former displayed a delicately etched logo "Beaver Falls Cutlery Company in a scroll with flowered ornamentation on the blade while the latter had a plain 27 mm stamp Beaver Falls Cut. Co." The 26-page BFCC catalog of the 1880s lists table knives, carvers, ivory carvers, screwdrivers, cigar knives, butchers' knives, stickers, skinner knives, hunting knives, scissors and shears. It lists many penknives: iron-lined, with redwood, brass-lined, and with German silver bolsters. It has a lithograph of the factory and of the American eagle trademark.

Beaver Falls Historical Museum has a set of BFCC table knives with carved ivory handles and metal inlays, dating from the 1870s to 1880s. Another set also has ivory-handled knives, but includes three-tined forks. The knife blades carry a trademark showing the American eagle overcoming the British lion. (Note: The trademark of the American eagle overcoming the British lion offended the British member of the awards committee at the Centennial Exposition, with the consequence that the company received no award in 1876.) The company also produced pearl-handled and wooden-handled tableware, and exhibited a pocketknife with 365 blades at the Centennial Exposition. Regarding quality, Samuel Mason said this:

"The forks are made from good quality of sheet steel, and hardened in oil with a spring temper, and beautifully finished; the prongs of the forks are well glazed inside and arched at the top; the fitting of the handle and bolster is flush and true, no plus 1-16th of an inch out of the handle; the blade of the knife is equally well ground and finished; every blade tested by being bent to a half circle; the prongs of the forks are twisted in like manner."

=== Largest knife and fork ===
In 1875, the largest-known carving knife and fork were those made by Joseph Rodgers & Son of 6 Norfolk Street, Sheffield, South Yorkshire, England. The set was made in celebration of the visit to Sheffield on 17 August of that year by Albert Edward, Prince of Wales. It was "A huge pair of carvers about six feet in length, the handles of which are of polished ivory." (Note: Rodgers was in production between 1682 and 1971. As of 2019, the whereabouts of the 1875 Sheffield carvers is unknown.)

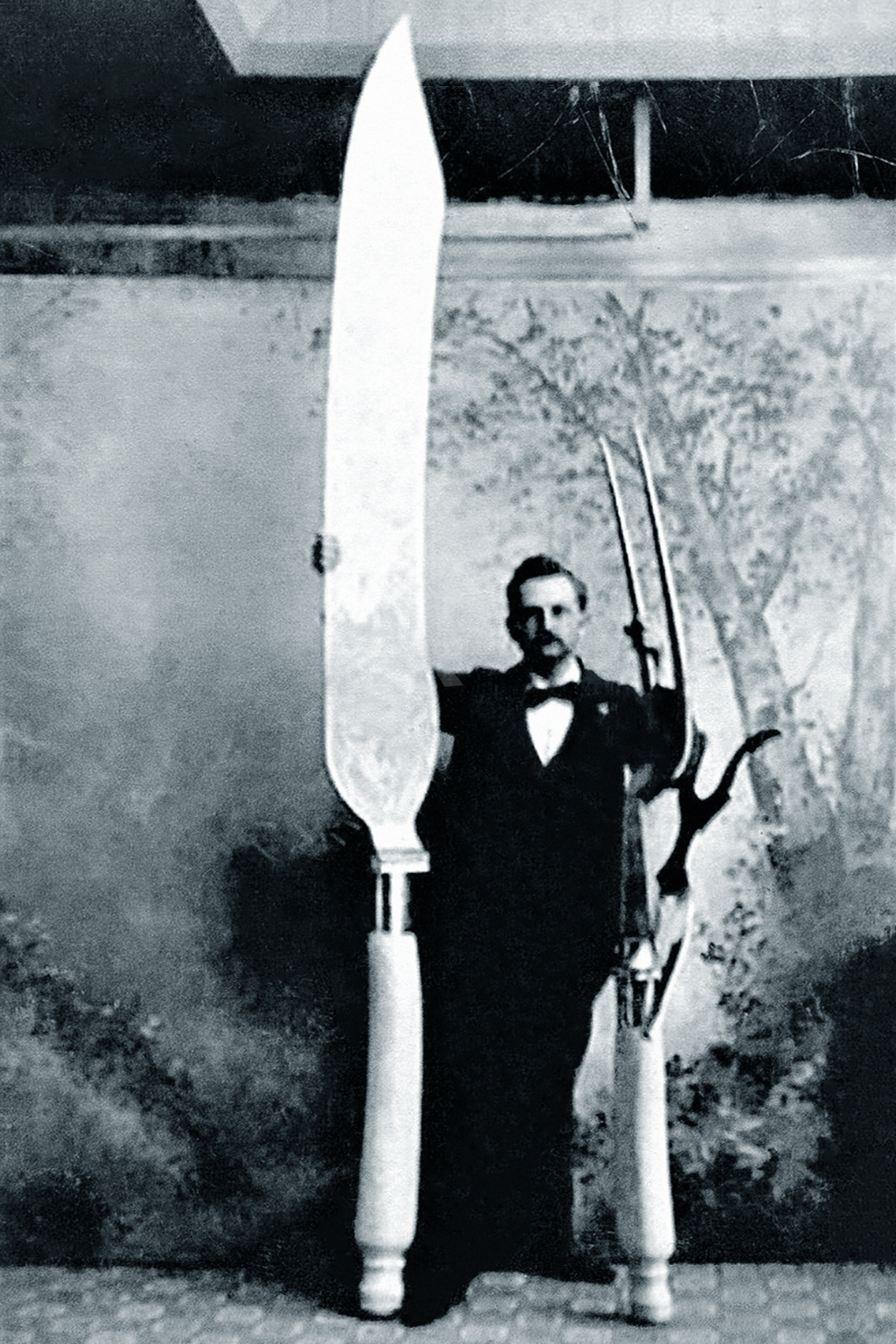
"Largest knife and fork in the world" in 1876

As a competitive response in 1876, Beaver Falls Cutlery Company made the "largest knife and fork in the world" of its time, at the cost of $1,500. It was designed as a table carving knife and fork. The knife measured nine feet seven inches, the blade being ten inches wide. At eight times the size of a normal knife and fork, it was larger than the Sheffield carvers. The knife handle was created from an elephant tusk, carved with flowers and vines. The Chinese employees and the regular workmen made this with steel forged at Beaver Falls, and it was exhibited at the Centennial Exhibition of Philadelphia in 1876. The etched design on the front of the BFCC carving knife blade included a silver-plated shark, a portrait of William Penn, the company name, the Pennsylvania coat of arms in complex detail and a portrait of Governor John F. Hartranft. On the reverse of the blade was scrollwork, and a picture of a mother with children. The carving fork had a patent spring guard which was etched with vines and clusters of grapes. The etching was by T.C. Moore, and the carving of the ivory handles was by Edwin Clayton.

As of 2019, the whereabouts of the Beaver Falls knife and fork set is unknown, although a search was made by a retired Beaver Falls teacher, Sidney Kane, in 1975. Cattaraugus Cutlery Company purchased it along with the company machinery in 1887 following the closure. The set was removed to Springville, New York, then returned to Little Valley, New York. Philip Champlin, great grandson of John Brown Francis Champlin of Cattaraugus Cutlery Company, inherited it after his family's firm closed in 1963. He mailed it in a specially made wooden crate to Wisconsin around February 1972, and nothing has been heard of it since.

=== Merchant counter stamps ===
Two examples of merchant counter stamps on coins have been found. The stamps are 27mm long, and read Beaver Falls Cut. Co. One is on a half dollar dated 1875.

== Museum exhibits ==
A small display of early tableware, razors and pocket knives made by the company is kept at the Beaver County Industrial Museum at Darlington, Pennsylvania, which also has library resources. The Beaver Falls Historical Society Museum, in the city's Carnegie library, houses a larger collection of artifacts associated with the Company.

== Patents associated with Beaver Falls Cutlery ==
- Thomas Skinner, 24 December 1867, US 72553. Improved method of forming designs upon metals, ivory etc.
- Samuel Mason and Edward Binns, 20 April 1869, US 89059A. Improvement in attaching handles to cutlery.
- R.H. Fisher, 16 March 1869, US 87767. Improvement in handles for table cutlery.
