= Thomas Skinner (etcher) =

- Born: 16 June 1819; Sheffield
- Died: 6 December 1881 (aged 62); 24 Glover Place, Sheffield
- Resting place: All Saints Church, Ecclesall
- Known for: Invention of transfer method of etching on steel blades
- Spouse: Melinda "Mellond" Mills

Thomas Skinner (16 June 1819 – 6 December 1881) was an etcher, inventor and amateur oil-painter in Sheffield, West Riding of Yorkshire, England. During the 1840s he invented a method by which the mass production of etched designs on steel blades could be facilitated by means of paper transfers. The British and American patents brought him a good income, but he devoted his life to developing the method. After he was widowed he was killed by arsenic poisoning at the hands of his housekeeper Kate Dover.

== Background ==
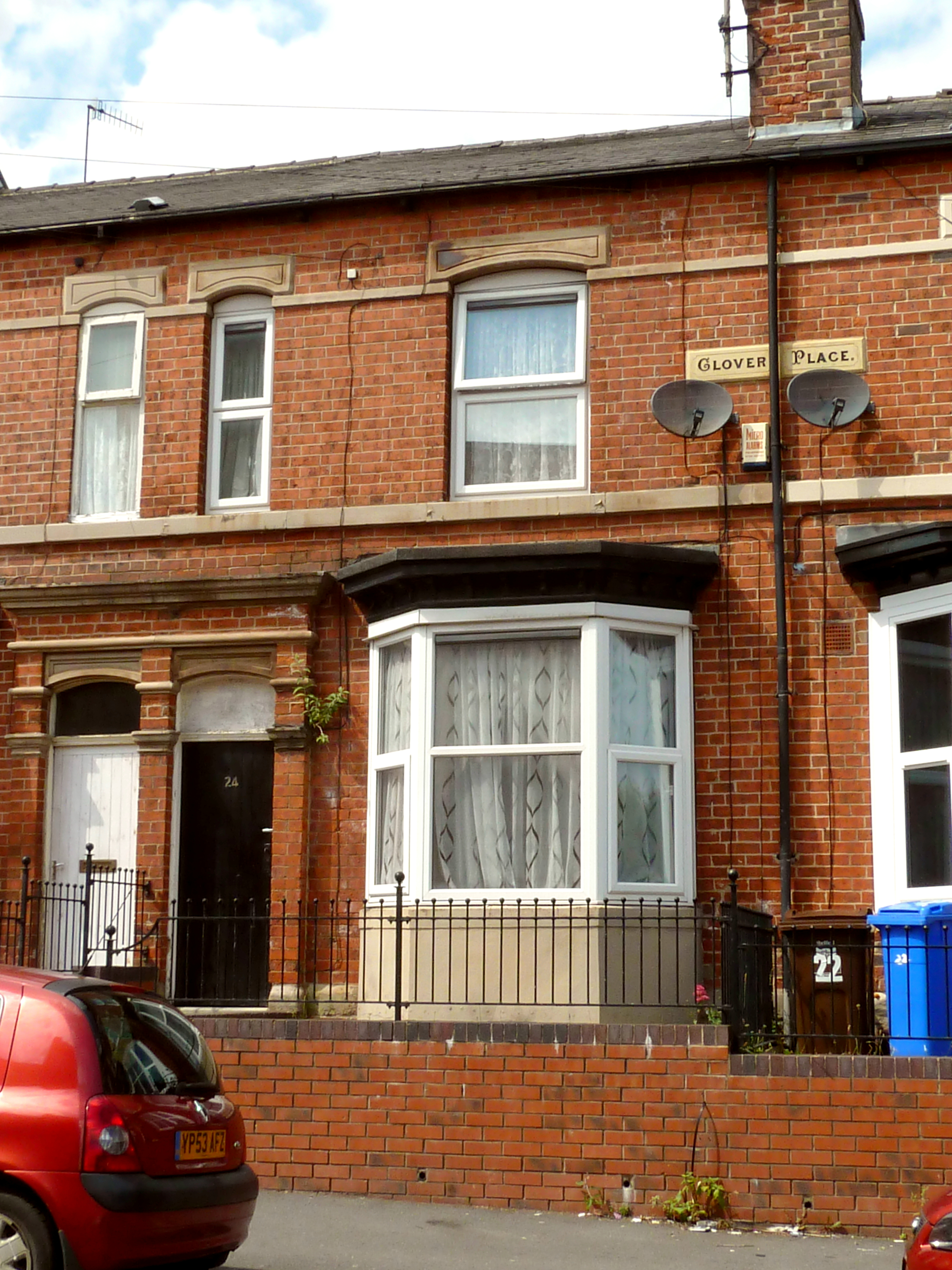
24 Glover Place, Skinner's last residence

Thomas Skinner's father was etcher and cutler Thomas Skinner senior, who worked for Joseph Rodgers & Sons of Sheffield. Thomas junior was born in Sheffield on 16 June 1819. By 1841 at the age of 22 he was an ornamenter, living in Carver Street, Sheffield, with his widowed mother Mary who kept a lodging house. He had three sisters: Ann, Matilda (born ca. 1820) and Eliza (born ca. 1830).

Skinner's wife was Melinda or Mellind Mills, also known as Mellond (1821–1876), daughter of grinder Samuel Mills, who was born and died in Ecclesall, Sheffield. They married on 1 October 1839 in the same town. He moved around a lot: in 1851 he was at West Street, and in 1857 he was at Regent Terrace, where he and his wife suffered a burglary. Charles Rushby was remanded and committed to Sessions, with breaking and entering, ransacking drawers and boxes, and stealing "a silver-plated salver, jug, mug, beaker, three egg cups, a spoon, together with a pair of boots". At that point, Skinner was described as a silver plater. By 1861 he was describing himself as an engraver on copper and living at 29 Charlotte Street, St George's, Sheffield, with Melinda and their son Clifford (Ecclesall 1855 – Poplar, London 1924). Mellond was buried on 28 November 1876 at All Saints Church, Ecclesall. At some point around the 1870s, Skinner lived at Upper Gell Street Sheffield.

Something of Skinner's character may be glimpsed from the court case of December 1856, in which the German silversmith Frederick Allen was charged with giving Skinner "a severe black eye". However there had previously been "unpleasantness" between Skinner and Allen, who was under notice to quit. On the day of the alleged assault, Allen refused to follow orders, and took it upon himself to pick out teapot handles for use at work without asking permission. Skinner called him a "scoundrel" and pushed him, and "a scuffle and fight ensued." The magistrates "took the view that Skinner had commenced the assault ... and dismissed the case". Later, as a widower, Skinner was very familiar with his servants; for example he chaffed Emma Bolsover "about not being so good-looking as her sister". Some witnesses said he was also a drunkard later in life, although his sister Ann Holmes said that he was not.

Skinner was nevertheless described by a friend as:

"A man of superior intellectual ability; had a very fine nervous organisation; and was extremely sensitive to all kinds of impressions. He was a kind, genial, sympathetic man, with a very strong love nature – much too strong in fact; a man of strong temper and great excitability. He possessed enormously developed perceptive faculties which gave him his artistic and mechanical skill, his love for music, and fitted him for doing almost any kind of refined and delicate work. A man of good easy conversational powers, he easily gathered knowledge from other sources than books, and turned it readily to use; but he had not much thinking power, and was consequently liable to be led away by his strong feelings, and to do things which were not wise. He had very strong self-esteem, was very opinionated, and extremely sensitive to adverse criticism. This, with his fine organisation, made him very gentlemanly and refined in his manners – and he exhibited to the world the bearings of a gentleman. His business faculties were not so strongly developed, and that will probably explain why he, along with many other inventors, did not reap the full benefit of his discoveries. Those who know the deceased best will most readily concur the accuracy of this description of him ... Skinner kept regular correspondence with artists John Manasseh and James Poole, and "he could quote with extreme accuracy from almost any poet of note."

== Business and employment ==
Skinner worked with his father as a cutler for Joseph Rodgers & Sons, 6 Norfolk Street, Sheffield. His father was brought to public notice for his painting of the flag of the Birmingham Political Union of 1832, but died before 1841. In 1845, at the age of 24 years, Skinner was still working for Rodgers. His work caught the attention of his employers, who submitted an example of his engraving to the Sheffield Independent. The newspaper described it as:

"A beautiful example of etching on steel, the production of a Sheffield mechanic. It is a copy of Stothard's Vintage, and the execution holds out great promise from its producer, Mr Thomas Skinner ... The piece possesses some claim to novelty, as well as merit, from being much larger in size than the generality of specimens of etching in steel, and is framed, for the purpose of hanging in a room."

Before his trip to America in the 1860s, Skinner attempted to profit from his invention by leaving paid employment and going into partnership. Coulson and Branson paid him £600 for right to his invention, and they went into partnership as Skinner, Coulson and Branson, working out of Sycamore Street. "His habits, however, were so unbusinesslike that the partnership only lasted a few years. In 1853 he was in partnership with Samuel Coulson and Joseph Heap, as Skinner & Co. However, although a large factory company might make good profit from his mass production idea, a small partnership business was more likely to have disproportionate overheads. This is illustrated by the 1853 court case Kilner vs. Skinner and Others. Skinner would not pay the full invoice of the engraver Kilner who had been hired to engrave designs on copper, from which the paper transfers would be taken. This was because Kilner had to engrave four times more deeply than normally required, so that enough acid could be put in the grooves for the transfer. However this took "a great number of times" more work and hours needed for normal engraving, hence the greater price. Kilner was awarded most of his claim by the Court. Thus on 25 April 1857 Skinner presented himself before the Court for a certificate of bankruptcy. Skinner was working for George Westenholm and Son of Washington Works, and "while engaged there, an event transpired which induced him to leave suddenly for America." This event may have been the bankruptcy.

Skinner was probably recruited in America in 1866 by Binns & Mason, the Rochester, Pennsylvania pocketknife company which was to become the Beaver Falls Cutlery Company. It was while working there for Samuel Mason that Skinner obtained the 1867 US patent for his invention. He stayed for six years then sold the patent for the equivalent of £500 to BFCC. He returned to Sheffield by 1874 when he hired Jane Jones as a nurse for his sick wife. Thereafter, until his death in 1881, he continued to support himself from home independently by use of his etching process.

== Skinner's invention ==
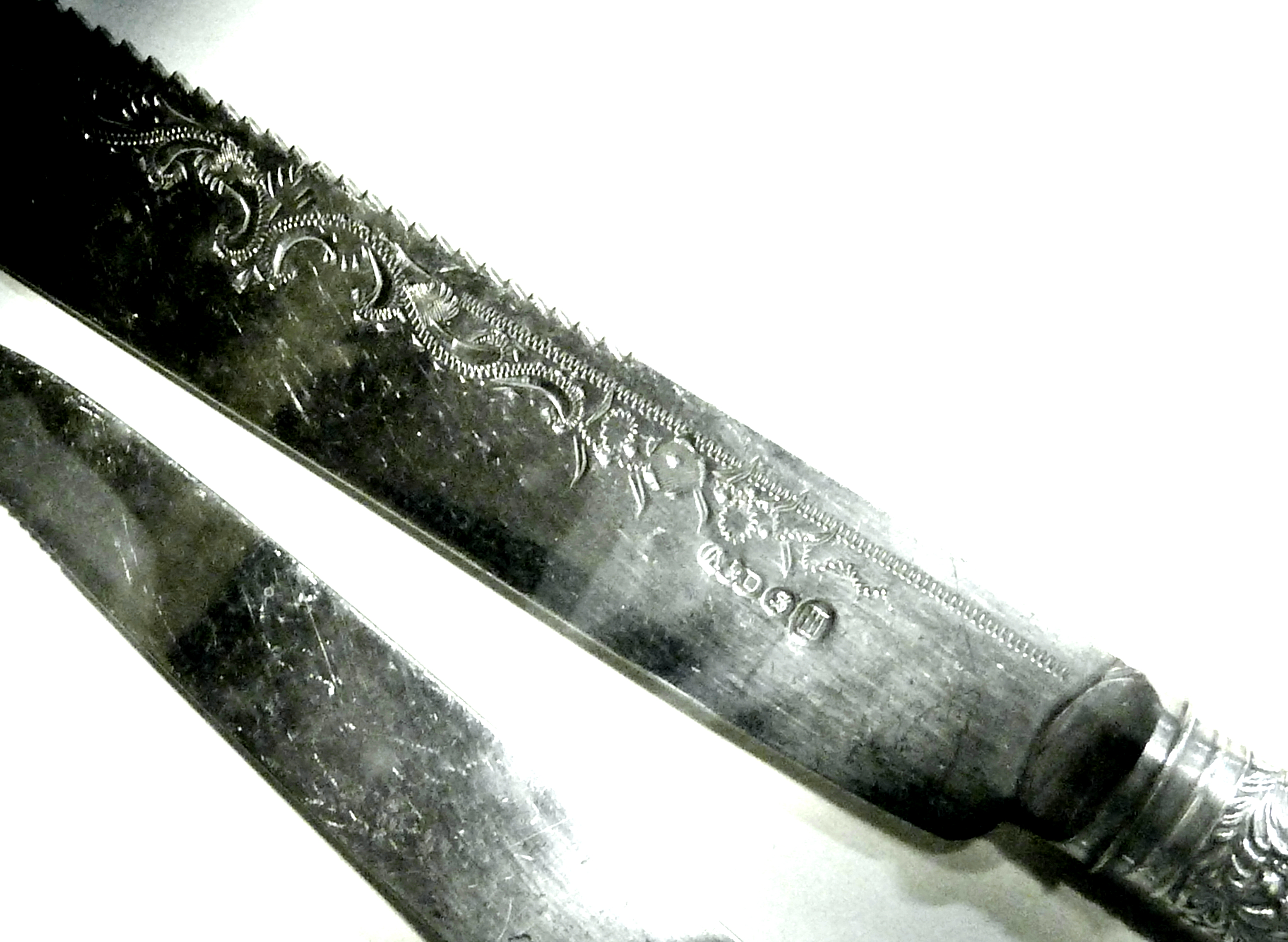
1910 knife blade engraved after Skinner's method

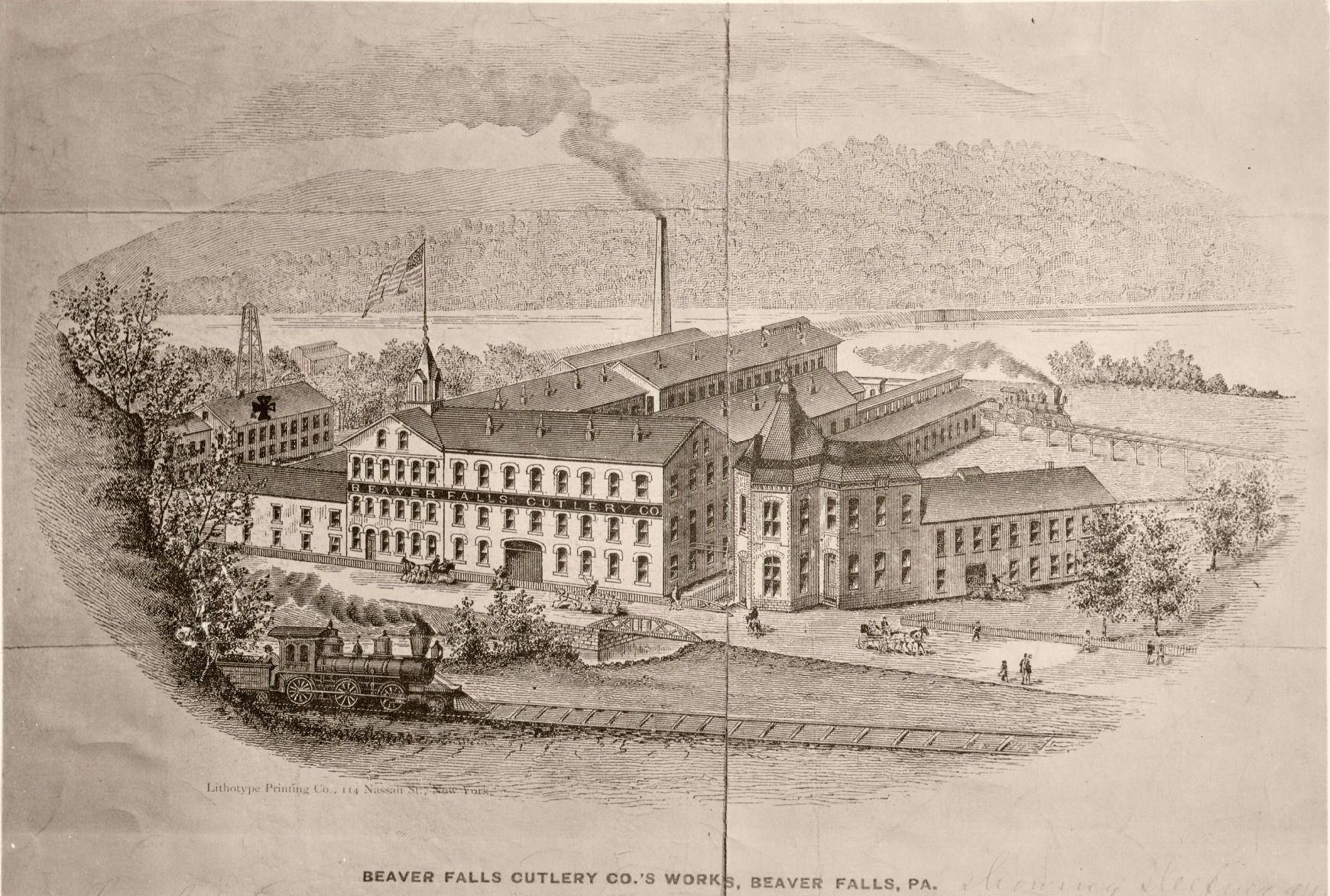
Beaver Falls Cutlery works, Pennsylvania, 1867

Skinner invented a method of etching designs into steel blades and bone handles of knives, which offered a potential for mass production, because it was faster and cheaper than traditional etching techniques. By 1849 he had perfected the invention so that it could be adopted by the industry, "to the productions of which it [was] unquestionably a boon of magnitude. The leading features [were] its simplicity, clearness, and especially cheapness." Prices quoted for decorating one item ranged from one old penny to threepence. This meant that now most steel blades could be etched upon; not just the expensive ones.

The 1851 patent idea was inspired by the traditional method used for the transference of patterns to pottery, and by a system used by Woodcocks of Howard Street, Sheffield, for transferring etchings of landscapes onto ivory since 1836. However in the case of the ivory transfers, the original design on copper was created as ridges, whereas in the case of Skinner's invention, the design on the copper original was created as grooves. In 1842 makers of steel blades had also used copper originals with ridges. In that case, the inked design was transferred as a blocker to the blade, then the whole blade was immersed in acid which ate away the metal between the design-lines, leaving the blocked design-ridges proud. Therefore the method used by Skinner was different from previous usages.

Skinner's UK patent of August 1851 was announced in Newton's List of patents. The guidebook to the 1851 Great Exhibition said: "Our readers will notice the beautiful designs on some of the steel articles, razors &c, sent from Sheffield. The method of executing this etching and gilding on steel, is the invention of Mr. Thomas Skinner, of Sheffield". The article he contributed was:

" a waiter, of Britannia metal, electro-plated with silver. The bottom is ornamented with a variety of scroll work which might be supposed to have been produced by the ordinary process of engraving or etching, but has been effected by a process which Mr Skinner describes as printing on metal ... There is, however, a marked difference in the fine lines, from those of ordinary engravings, the sharpness of outline being wanting. The recommendation of the process is its cheapness.

Skinner registered a patent no.72553 in Pittsburgh on 24 December 1867. This American patent is described thus:

72,553. Thomas Skinner, Pittsburgh, Pa. Method of Forming Designs upon Metals, Ivory, etcetera. December 24, 1867. To produce ornamental figures upon steel, the design is first engraved upon a copper plate. A proof is taken upon thin paper with ink made by boiling oil to a viscid consistence and adding a little lampblack. The design is transferred to the steel plate, and the paper is removed with water, leaving the ink upon the steel. The plate is then coated with a light spirit varnish. The ink is removed by application of oil of turpentine, and dilute acid applied to act only on the parts previously covered by the ink. After removal of the acid by water the varnish is removed by benzine. Claim. The herein-described method of preparing the design upon the article to be operated on preparatory to the etching process by the means of transfers, substantially as set forth.

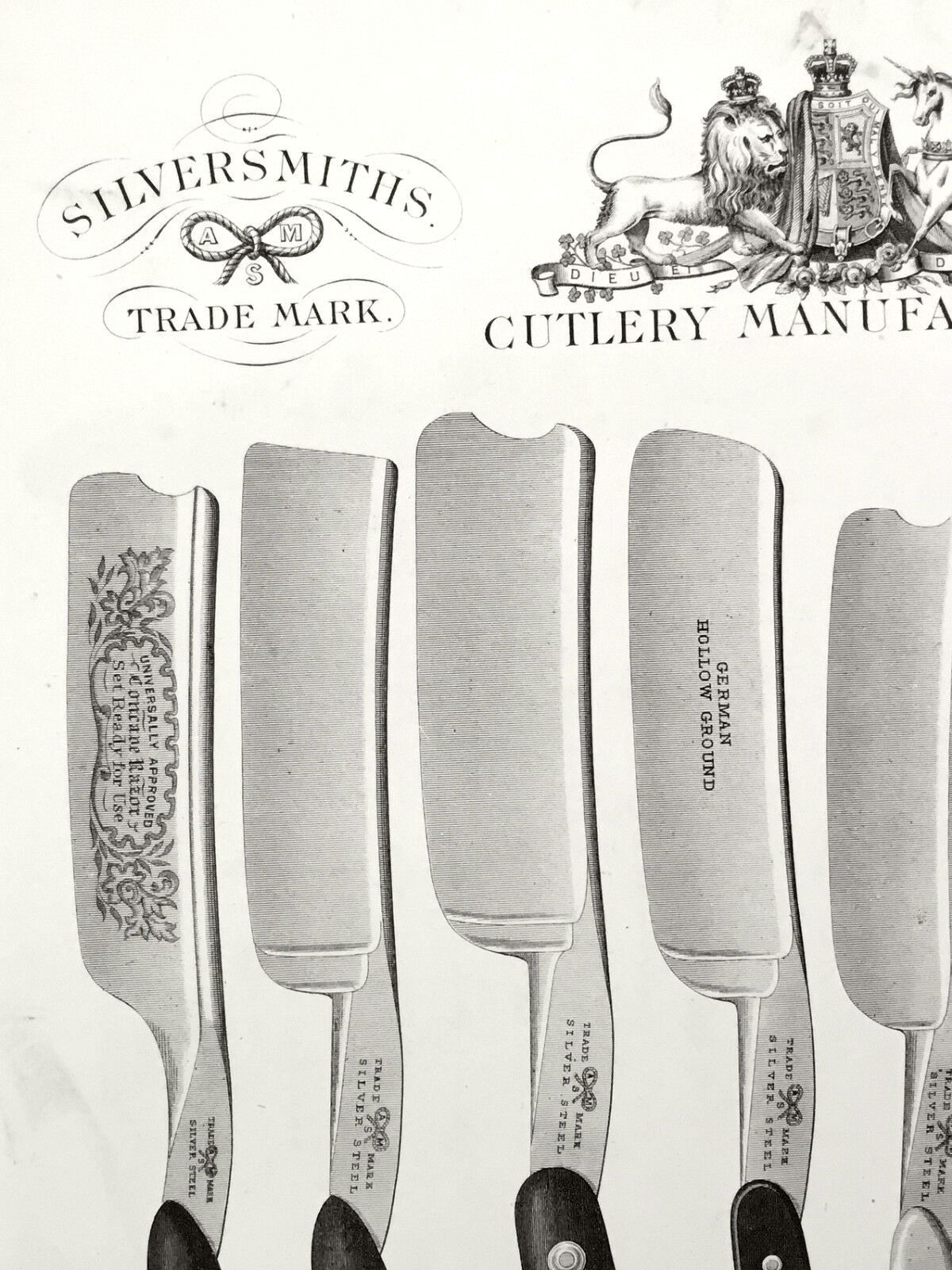
Engraved razor blade, 1880

In 1874, his UK patent for the invention of "improvements in the mode or process of etching on steel or iron, or other metal or substance" was Gazetted.

A description of the process was given by Mr Branson who met Skinner around 1856.

"Having engraved the desired design on a small sheet of copper, he applied the chemical ink, and secured the impression by rubbing a strip of paper with his finger. The print was placed in position on the blade of the knife, and rubbed with the finger. The design being now transferred, a little oil was brushed on, and the acid applied. In a few minutes the etching was complete. So simple and easy was the method, that he probably would do half a gross in the hour. Having witnessed his etching, he took me to his rooms in Eldon street, and showed me his jewelled plate. Though a stranger, he invited me to become his partner."

An improved patent was announced by Skinner and Branson around 1856. It was described by The Sheffield Independent as follows:

"Take first a copper plate, and take first from it an impression with an ink made by boiling linseed oil to the consistency of common treacle; the paper used is thin, similar to that in use by the potters in transferring prints to earthenware. When the impression is taken, it is transferred to the article to be decorated, the ink used being of a stick(y) or glutinous nature. A sponge and warm water are then used to crumble off the paper, when the impression of ink will be found on the metal surface; fine resin (powdered) is then applied to the surface through a sieve of fine gauze; the fine particles of resin fix themselves closely to the sticky impression; in fact, sink into it. In this state, the work is left for a few hours; by this time the impression becomes completely saturated with the resin. A soft brush then dusts off the powdered resin (which is very important) by a soft rag. By this time, you have the resin sunk into and on the design, while the surface is perfectly clean from it. In this state, hot water is poured on the work, which melts the resin and amalgamates it with the printing ink, which becomes a varnish sufficiently powerful to resist strong acid. The work is then bitten in in the same method by which engravers bite in their work. The surface being cleansed, the article is then ready for plating ... The acids used are, of course, the secrets of the trade."

After Skinner's return from America, Branson met Skinner again: "From the founder of the Beaver Falls Cutlery Works (also a Sheffield man) (Note: Samuel Mason, inventor of iron-handled knives, patent 89059, was the Sheffield man who became founder-president of the company. The company was founded as Binns & Mason in 1866 in Rochester, PA, by Edward Binns and Samuel Mason. By 13 October that year it had become Pittsburgh Cutlery Company. It was sold and in April 1867 moved to Beaver Falls. By early 1868 its name was Beaver Falls Cutlery Company. See: Tweedale, Geoffrey, Sheffield Steel and America, Cambridge University Press (1987), p.131. ISBN 0-52-110975-2) I learned something of his luck in America. Being employed at these works, he induced the proprietor to purchase the invention for etching at a goodly price. It was, however, soon found out that the patent (of 1867) could not be enforced, the process being now common in the trade. Mr Skinner showed me a painting of these works, a large red brick building, unpicturesque in its angular and staring newness."

== Amateur art ==
Thomas Skinner was an etcher, an artist and a landscape painter in oils, showing "considerable merit as an amateur". Skinner exhibited works in Division Street and the Society of Artists' Exhibition in Sheffield. The Sheffield Daily Telegraph said, "Altogether his style of colour is vivid and showy; lacking the suggestiveness of mystery."

At 11.00 a.m. on 9 February 1882, after Skinner's death and on the day when his killer was sentenced, a sale of his effects was held at his former home in Glover Road. The crowd began to gather "long before" the start of the sale, and increased to "between three and four hundred". Female attendees made it clear that "The Heeley Queen had few friends amongst them," and amongst them were Skinner's two sisters and Jane Jones, his former housekeeper. When Kate Dover's sentence was reported, it was "hailed with apparent satisfaction," and "the greatest merriment prevailed throughout." There were customers who "only wanted something that had been his," and it so happened that just before the auction a "large dray" full of furniture from "outside sources" was added by the auctioneer. Bidders were permitted to believe that a tin pudding dish was the one used for the poisoned onion stuffing, and it realised 1s 2d and an announcement from the winning bidder that it would hang on the wall, although the real dish for poisoning was in the hands of the police.

Nearly forty of Skinner's oil paintings were in the sale. The Sheffield Independent thought them "crudely executed". The paintings were: The Beaver Cutlery works, North America, A lane near Matlock Bath, Beechwood Glen, A companion picture, Mademoiselle Beatrice, The Woman of the People, Landscape, Meeting in the lane, Spanish scene, Cattle in the meadow, A country lane, Windmill and cattle after Birket Foster, Scene on an American farm, Alpine loch and cattle, A log cabin, An American lake scene, A prison scene during the French Revolution, Lake scenery in America, A wood in America, A Derbyshire Toll-Bar, The flute-player, The Queen of Hearts, A Spanish beauty, A bridge at Windermere, Sheep waiting for admission at the gate, The meeting place, Beech trees and cattle, Cottage near a wood, The old farm, Scene in a Derbyshire lane, Going to market, Erin go bragh, Cottages near Southport, The drunkard's home, A country walk, Cattle at water, and Cattle and sheep.

=== Oil paintings executed in America ===
In 1868 Skinner painted the new works at Beaver Falls, and on 14 November of that year the Fishkill Standard reported:

"At Van Wagner's photogram gallery ... a fine painting of the Beaver Falls Cutlery works ... including the adjacent landscape. It was executed by Mr Thos. Skinner of Sheffield, England, who was commissioned by the company to paint it. It was executed with great care and fidelity to details, and we have no doubt is an admirable reproduction of the actual scene, having been painted not only from careful study on the spot, but also by the assistance of photographs. It was mainly executed in Matteawan, the past summer, the artist being on a visit to his relatives there, Messrs John and William Rothery. The painting, which has been photographed by Mr Van Wagner, is valued at $500. It has already been shipped to the company, at Beaver Falls."

Skinner's former business partner Branson said that he saw Skinner's landscapes in oils. His figure paintings, Charlotte Corday and The Drunkard's Return, (Note: The Drunkard's Return may relate to the American temperance play The Drunkard (1844)) were both highly detailed and "finished to the fingernail". He commented that "The Drunkard's Return has a melancholy interest in connection with Mr Skinner's later habits of life. The scene was evidently conceived in America. In the foreground around an American stove, are grouped the ragged wife and family of the sot, who, in a loathsome state of inebriation and rags, gropes his way down the steps into the miserable cellar which now forms his dwelling.

== Death ==
After he had courted his housekeeper Felicia Dorothea Kate Dover, known as Kate Dover, for some months, she killed him on 6 December 1881 by the use of arsenic poisoning in onion stuffing, served as part of a roast dinner. At her trial in 1882 she was sentenced to life imprisonment for manslaughter. Skinner died at 8.40 p.m. on 6 December 1881, at his home in 24 Glover Place, Sheffield. (Note: National Archives record of death duties: see Index To Death Duty Registers 1796–1903, Birth, Marriage, Death & Parish Records, Wills and Probate, ref. IR27/419. Court of Probate: South Collingham. Executor William Skinner of Weston and another, Court PR, folio 1583)

=== Burial ===
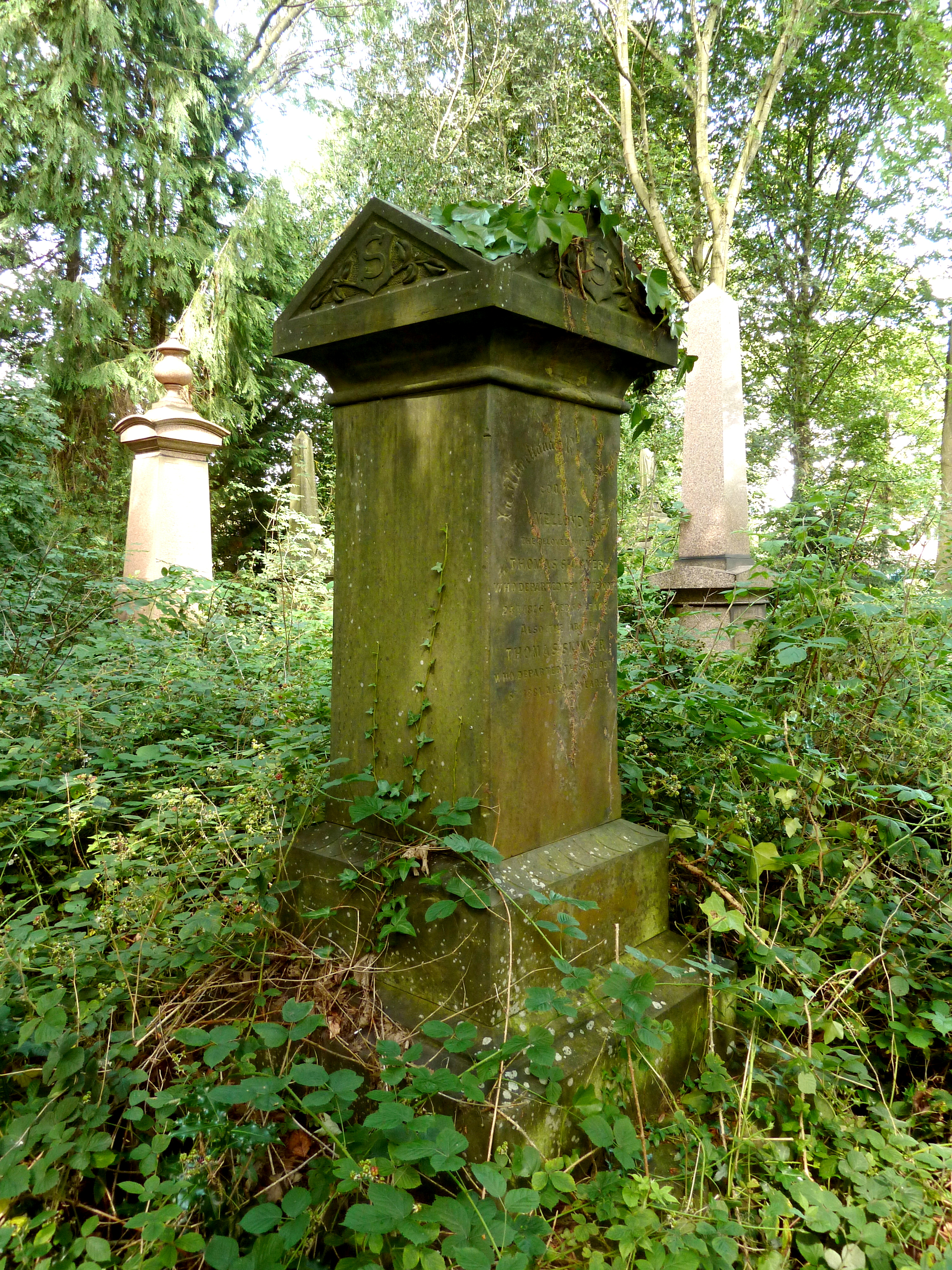
Gravestone of Thomas Skinner, at Ecclesall

Skinner was buried on Monday 12 December 1881 in a vault at "the centre of the upper portion of the churchyard" at All Saints Church, Ecclesall. The plot has a "handsome monolithic column" which bears the inscription, "In affectionate remembrance of Mellond, the beloved wife of Thomas Skinner who departed this life Nov 24th 1876 aged 56 years. Also the above Thomas Skinner who departed this life Dec 6th 1881 aged 62 years." Burial records are in Sheffield Archives. On the day of the funeral a "large crowd" assembled outside Skinner's house, to see the polished oak coffin with "Thomas Skinner, aged 65" (sic) engraved on it. Two coaches containing relatives of Skinner, and Jane Jones, followed the coffin to the church, and after them walked "fifty or sixty persons, mostly of the fairer sex". The service was taken by Reverend Sandford. (Note: This was Reverend George Sandford, vicar of Ecclesall-Beirlow All Saints from 1880. He was a scholar and MA of Magdalene College, Cambridge, and was also chaplain of Sheffield General Cemetery.) Most of the mourners "wept bitterly" as they proceeded from the funeral service to the burial place. "The clergyman uttered the closing words of the burial service in a downpour of hail and rain."

=== Administration of the will ===
Ann Holmes, sister of Skinner and wife of asphalter Thomas Holmes, lived in "humble circumstances" in Pearl Street, Sheffield, and thought that Skinner was aged 65 instead of 62 when he died, which raises the question as to whether he and she were estranged. In December 1881, Ann was promised the house and valuables in due course by the police, and given an advance of £5 for mourning clothes and funeral arrangements. On 11 February 1882, administration of Skinner's estate of £726 10s 11d was granted to Ann.
