= Cattaraugus Cutlery Company =

American knife manufacturer

The Cattaraugus Cutlery Company building in Little Valley, New York in 2009

The Cattaraugus Cutlery Company began as the New York distribution company J.B.F. Champlin and Son, founded by John Brown Francis Champlin and his son Tint in 1882. The Champlins expanded into knife production, and along with William R. Case and his brothers, they formed Cattaraugus Cutlery in 1886, based in Little Valley. The company hired expert cutlers from Germany, England, and other U.S. manufacturers, to produce high quality cutlery, and purchased knife-making equipment from the defunct Beaver Falls Cutlery Company. Admiral Byrd selected Cattaraugus knives to take on his expedition to the South Pole.

Over time, the Case family separated from Cattaraugus to form W. R. Case & Sons Cutlery Co., incorporated in 1905. Cattaraugus closed business in 1963. Two separate fires destroyed the building in August 2015 and August 2016; it had stood for several decades vacant (another business occupied the factory's office building, which remains standing, for a time in the 1970s) and had fallen into severe disrepair by the time of the first fire.
