= Hunting knife =

Type of knife used during hunting

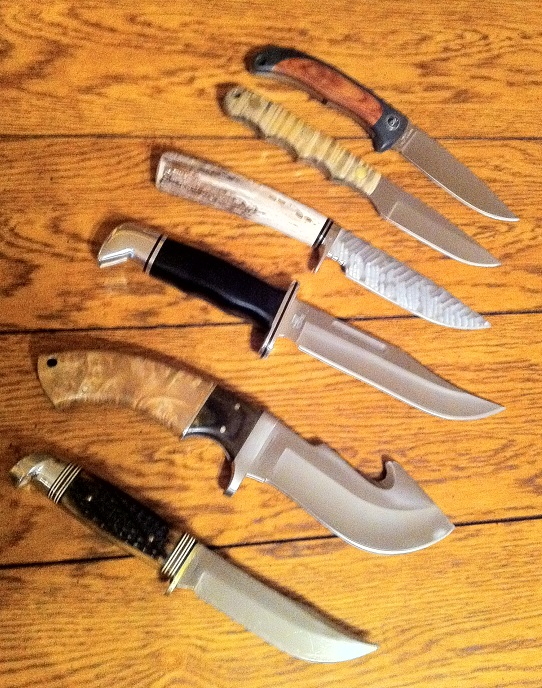
An assortment of hunting knives

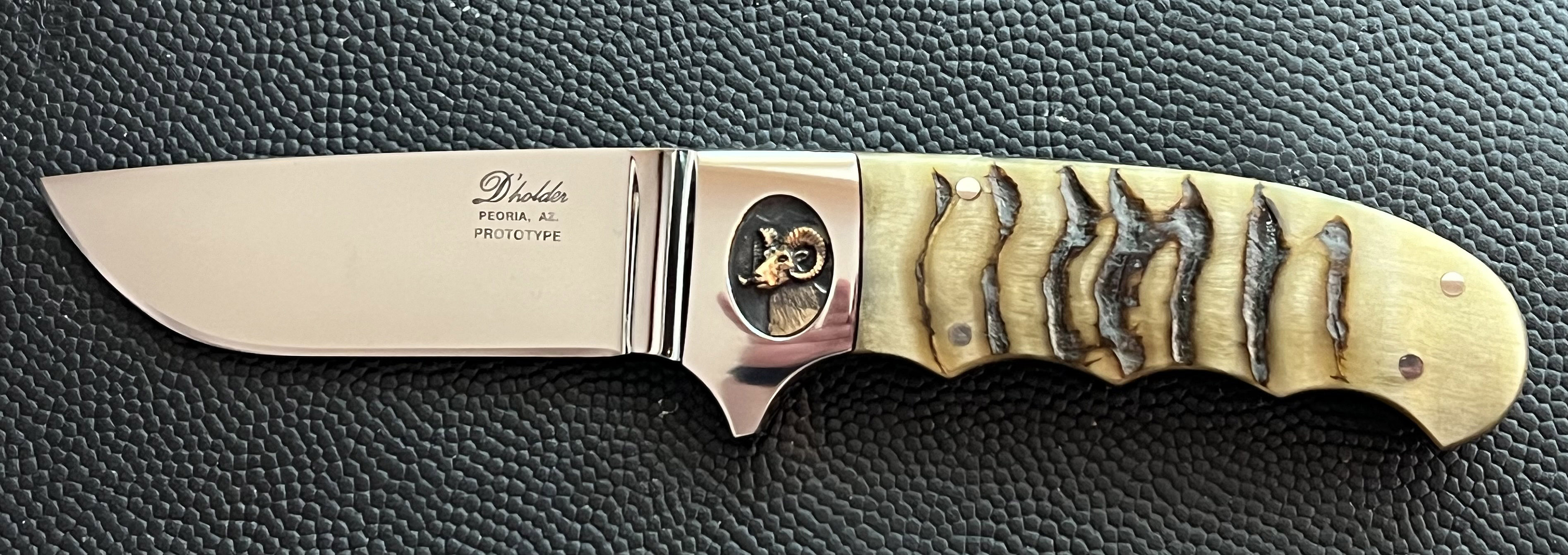
A 1975 prototype of d'Alton Holder's iconic hunting knife, with a ram-horn handle

A hunting knife is a knife used during hunting for preparing the game to be used as food by skinning the animal and cutting up its meat. It is different from the hunting dagger which was traditionally used to kill wild game.

Some hunting knives are adapted for other uses in the wild, such as a camp knife, which hunters may use as machetes or hatchets when those specific tools are not available. In this case, their function is similar to a survival knife.

== Design ==
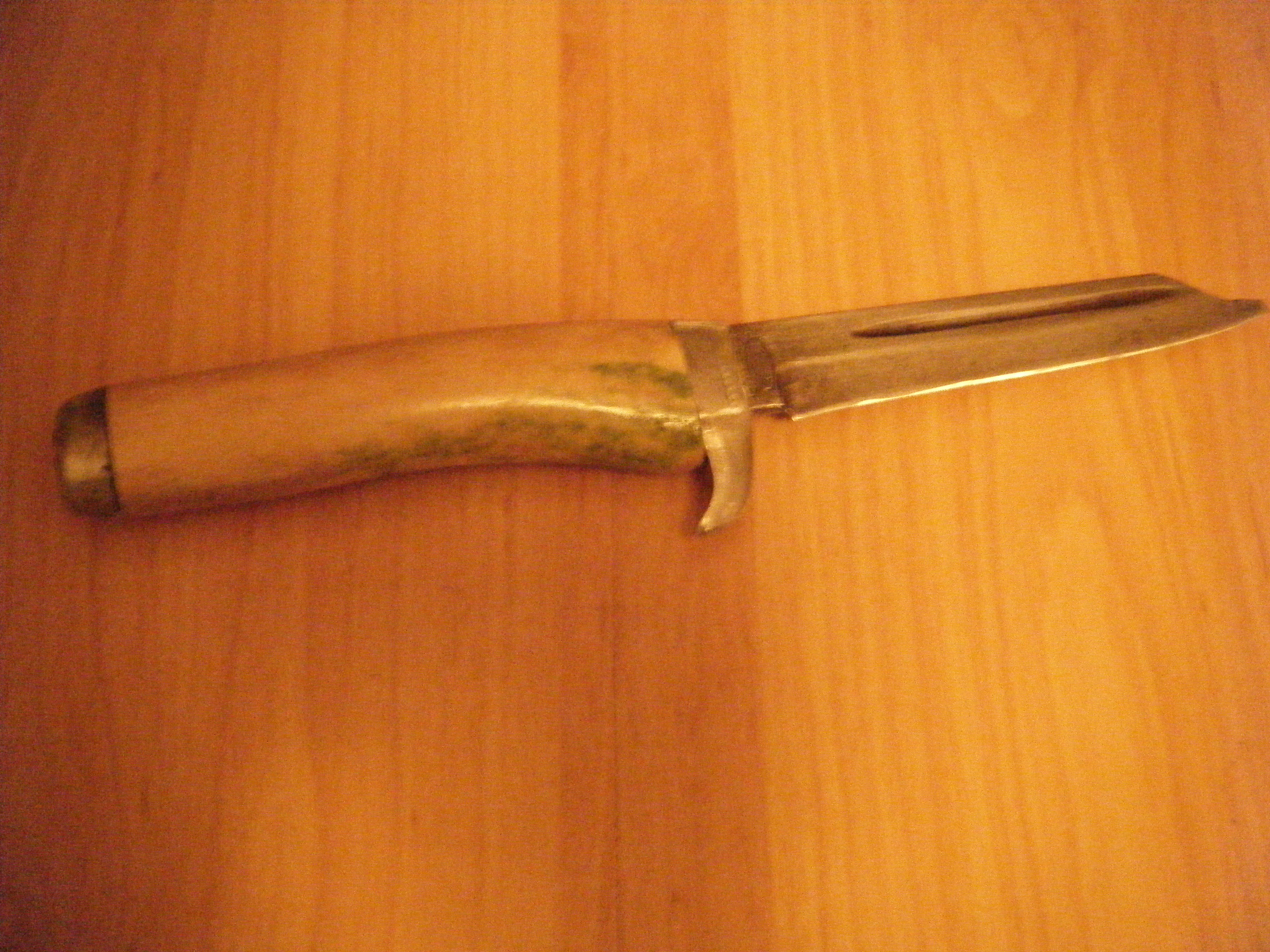
A hunting knife with a deer-antler handle

Hunting knives are traditionally designed for cutting rather than stabbing, and usually have a single sharpened edge. The blade is slightly curved on most models, and some hunting knives may have a blade that has both a curved portion for skinning, and a straight portion for cutting slices of meat. Some blades incorporate a gut hook. Most hunting knives designed as "skinners" have a rounded point as to not damage the skin as it is being removed.

== Types of knife ==
- Fixed-Blade Knife – Fixed-blade knives have the practical advantage of their simple design. If the game you hunt is large and the terrain more rugged, a fixed-blade knife is often a better option for its strength and dependability.
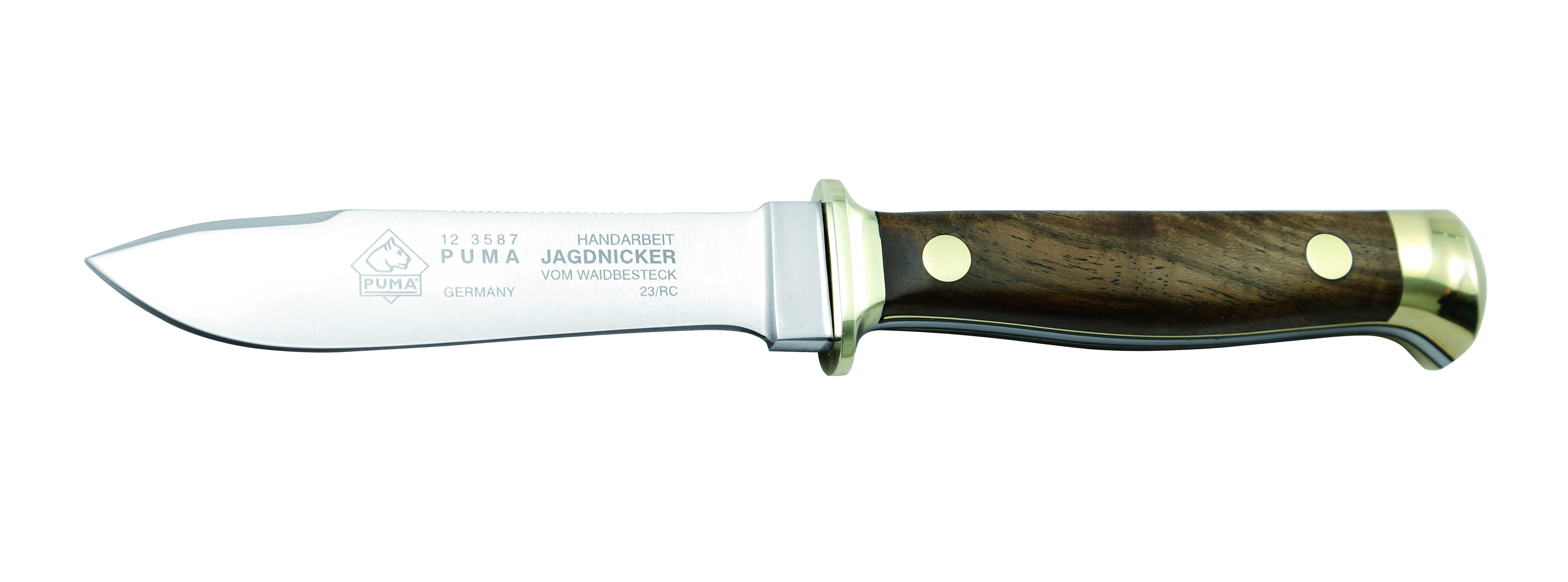
  PUMA jagdnicker build after Frevert
- Folding Knife – Folding knives have the advantage of being easier to carry and to conceal. They are also considered safer. They can be kept in a pocket easily.
- Out the Front Knife – OTF knives are usually used by military personnel.
- Replaceable Blade Knives – Knives having interchangeable blades or ones with a handle that may carry a separate blade are known as replaceable blade knives.

== Type of blade ==
- Clip Point – The clip point knife blade is thin with a well-defined point. The blade itself is relatively flat. This type of blade is used for dressing and skinning.
- Drop Point – The blade of a drop point knife is thick and curved. It is used for dressing and skinning.
- Skinning Blade – This type of blade is specially designed for skinning. The blade quickly and neatly separates skin from meat.

== Examples ==
Hunting knives include the puukko, the Yakutian knife, and the Sharpfinger. Most American designs are based on a smaller version of the Bowie knife. Knifemaker Bob Loveless popularized the drop point hunting knife and William Scagel popularized the Camp knife.

== See also ==
- Hunting sword
- Priest
- Sgian-dubh
