= Sharpfinger =

Brand of knife

SHARPFINGER is a brand of knife modeled after the Schrade 152 OT. The SHARPFINGER trademark is designated to a variety of knives in this design (3.5 in (8.9 cm) upswept blade) by a number of makers.

Schrade Cutlery - Old Timer Model 1520T Sharpfinger

== History ==
The Sharpfinger knife was primarily produced by American companies such as Imperial Schrade and Camillus Cutlery Company, as well as by custom knifemakers. However, Imperial Schrade ceased its U.S. operations in 2004, followed by Camillus in 2007, and the rights to those brand names were subsequently sold. Presently, the Schrade Sharpfinger is produced in China, available in both large and small sizes, but the quality is not comparable to the original Schrade knives.

== Description ==
The Schrade Sharpfinger is a fixed-blade utility knife, measuring approximately 7.5 inches (19.1 cm) in overall length, with a 3.5-inch (8.9 cm) blade. It features sawcut (textured) "Delrin" synthetic scales. The blade showcases a pronounced curve, setting it apart from the majority of utility knives available in the United States. Additionally, it is smaller than the average American utility or hunting knife.

== Variants ==
- Schrade-Walden Sharp Finger (USA) -- high-carbon steel, rare variant
- Schrade 152 Old Timer Sharpfinger (USA) -- high-carbon steel
- Schrade 152 Uncle Henry Wolverine (USA) -- stainless
- Camillus Grand'Pa Sharp Hunter (USA)
- Rigid Max Edge Hunter (USA)
- Arrowhead Roadrunner (USA)
- Taylor/Schrade LLC Sharpfinger (China)
- Winchester (China)--

Variants of the Sharpfinger were offered with the following handle materials:

- Smooth colored Delrin (cream, yellow, orange, black)
- Scrimshawed cream Delrin
- Stag (several patterns)
- Staglon (several patterns)
- Jigged bone (various cuts and colors)
- Wood (various types)

== Famous owners ==
Probably the most famous user of a Schrade Sharpfinger knife is Sonny Barger, founder of the Hells Angels Motorcycle Club.

In an interview with Harper/Collins regarding his book Dead in 5 Heartbeats, Barger commented on the Sharpfinger knife:

A lot of people I ride with carry that knife. I actually prefer fixed blades—like the Sharpfinger—to a folded blade. Although I carry a folded blade too, with a fixed blade you don't have to reach inside your pocket. It's always handy, on your belt when you need it. I use my Sharpfinger as a tool. I do everything with it. I like knives with sharp points. You never know when you might want to pop a balloon or peel a banana.

Marc "Animal" MacYoung and Fred Perrin hold favorable views of the Sharpfinger as Animal discusses in his book "Knives, Knife Fighting and Related Hassles" and the Nemo Sandman site for Fred Perrin in the 1990s.
