= All Saints Church, Ecclesall =

Parish church in Sheffield, South Yorkshire, England

Coordinates: 53.3568°N 1.5120°W

All Saints, Ecclesall
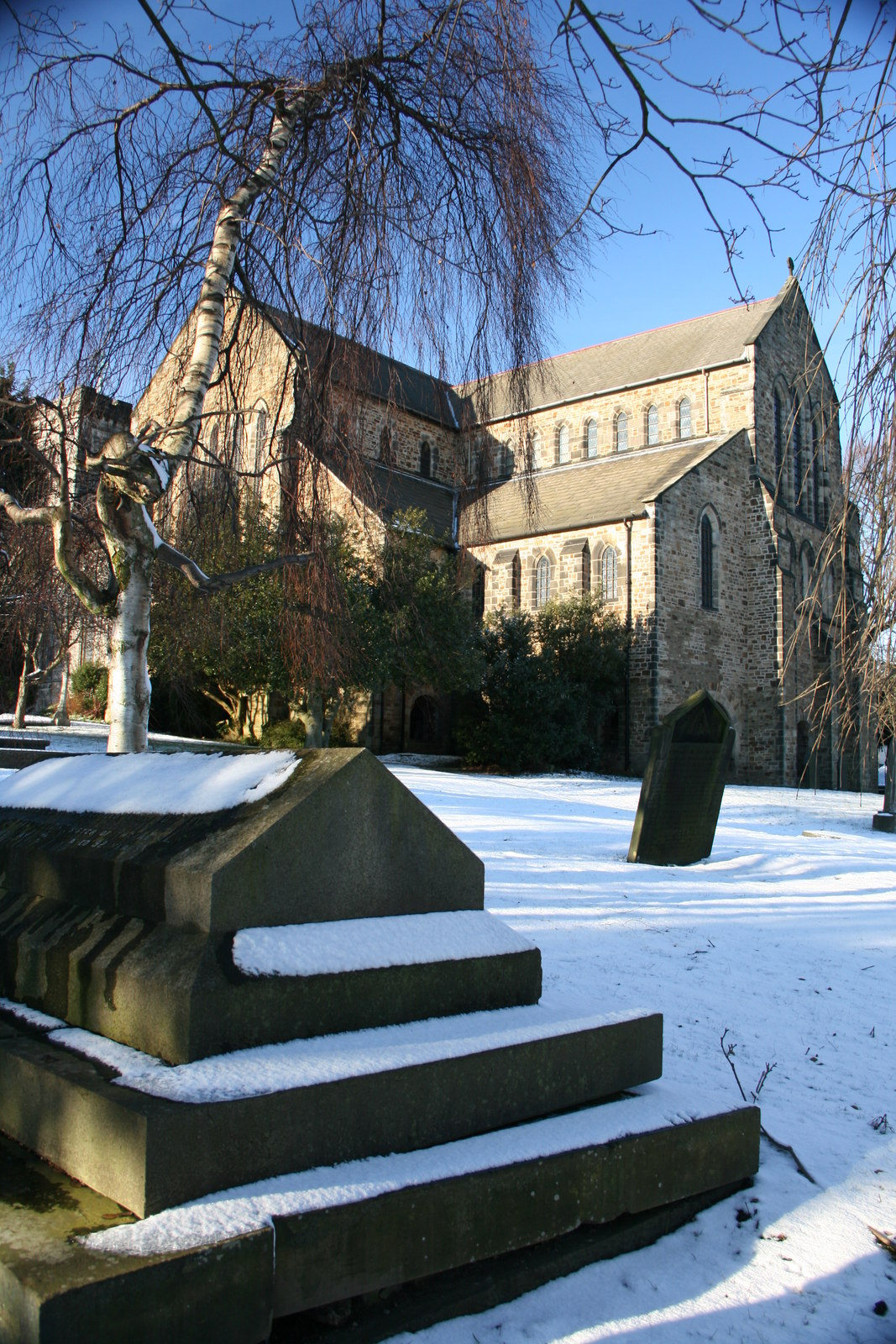
- OS grid reference: SK 32581 84540
- Denomination: Church of England
- Churchmanship: Open Evangelical
- Website: Official website

Administration
- Province: York
- Diocese: Diocese of Sheffield
- Archdeaconry: Sheffield
- Deanery: Ecclesall
- Parish: Ecclesall

Clergy
- Vicar(s): Rev Canon Mark Brown

All Saints is a Church of England parish church in Sheffield, England. It is a Grade II listed building, and is located in Ecclesall, between Ringinglow Road and Ecclesall Road South. All Saints' emergent youth and young adults congregation is called "The Uncut Project".

== History ==
In the thirteenth century, Ralph de Ecclesall gave his mill on the River Sheaf to the monks of Beauchief Abbey. Out of the proceeds of the mill the monks were to provide a canon to officiate at daily services in his chapel. These services continued until the Dissolution of the Monasteries in the sixteenth century. In 1622, the chapel was restored and brought back into use as a chapel of ease to the parish of Sheffield. In the 1780s a new chapel was constructed a short distance from the old one, this opened on 13 December 1788 and the old chapel was demolished. This building was improved in 1843 and enlarged in 1864. The parish of Sheffield was sub-divided in 1845 and Ecclesall chapel became the mother church of the parish of Ecclesall. A new transept was added in 1907, and the church was reordered in 1964 by George Pace, and again in 1997.

=== List of Vicars ===
- 1849–1853 Rev William Humphrey Vale
- 1853–1856 Rev Henry Farish
- 1856–1880 Rev Edward Newman
- 1880–1898 Rev George Sandford
- 1899–1927 Rev Canon Thomas Houghton
- 1928–1938 Rev Canon Herbert William Mackay
- 1939–1960 Rev Canon George Jefferis Jordan
- 1960–1967 Rev Richard Hanson
- 1968–1990 Rev Canon John Norman Collie
- 1991–2006 Rev Canon Dr Peter Williams
- 2007–2012 Rev Canon Simon Bessant
- 2012–2013 Rev Stephen Hunter (Acting)
- 2013–2019 Rev Canon Dr Gary Wilton
- 2021–Present Rev Canon Mark Brown

== See also ==
- List of works by George Pace
