= Blade shearing =

Sheep husbandry practice

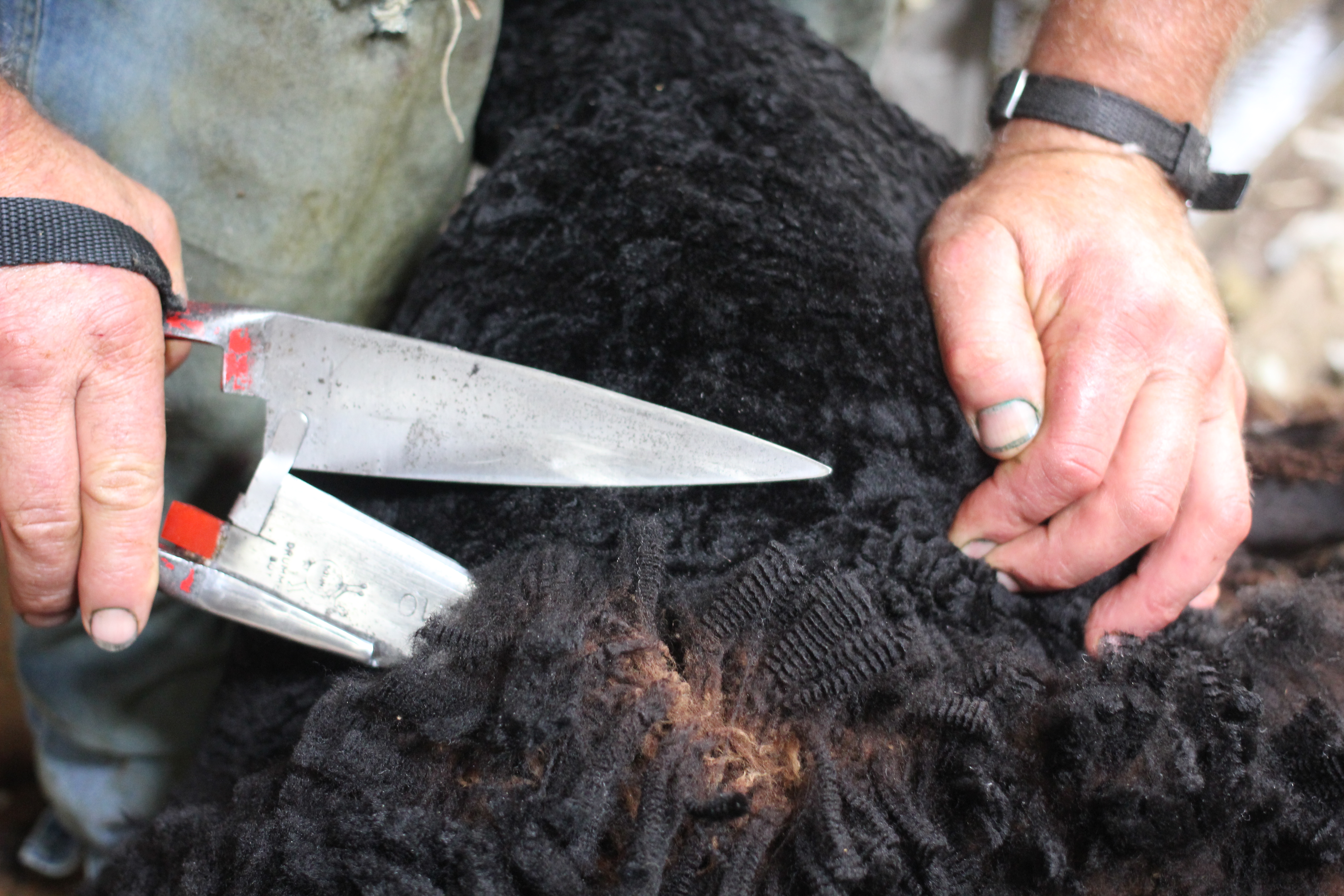
A blade shearer at work on a black sheep

Blade shearing or hand shearing is the style of shearing sheep and other animals with fibrous coats (alpaca, llama, goats etc.) with a set of specialized scissors. It is practiced in many parts of the world as both an occupation and a sport. Commercial blade shearers shear on average 140 sheep in an 8-hour working day, but some will shear over 200 sheep in a day.

== History ==
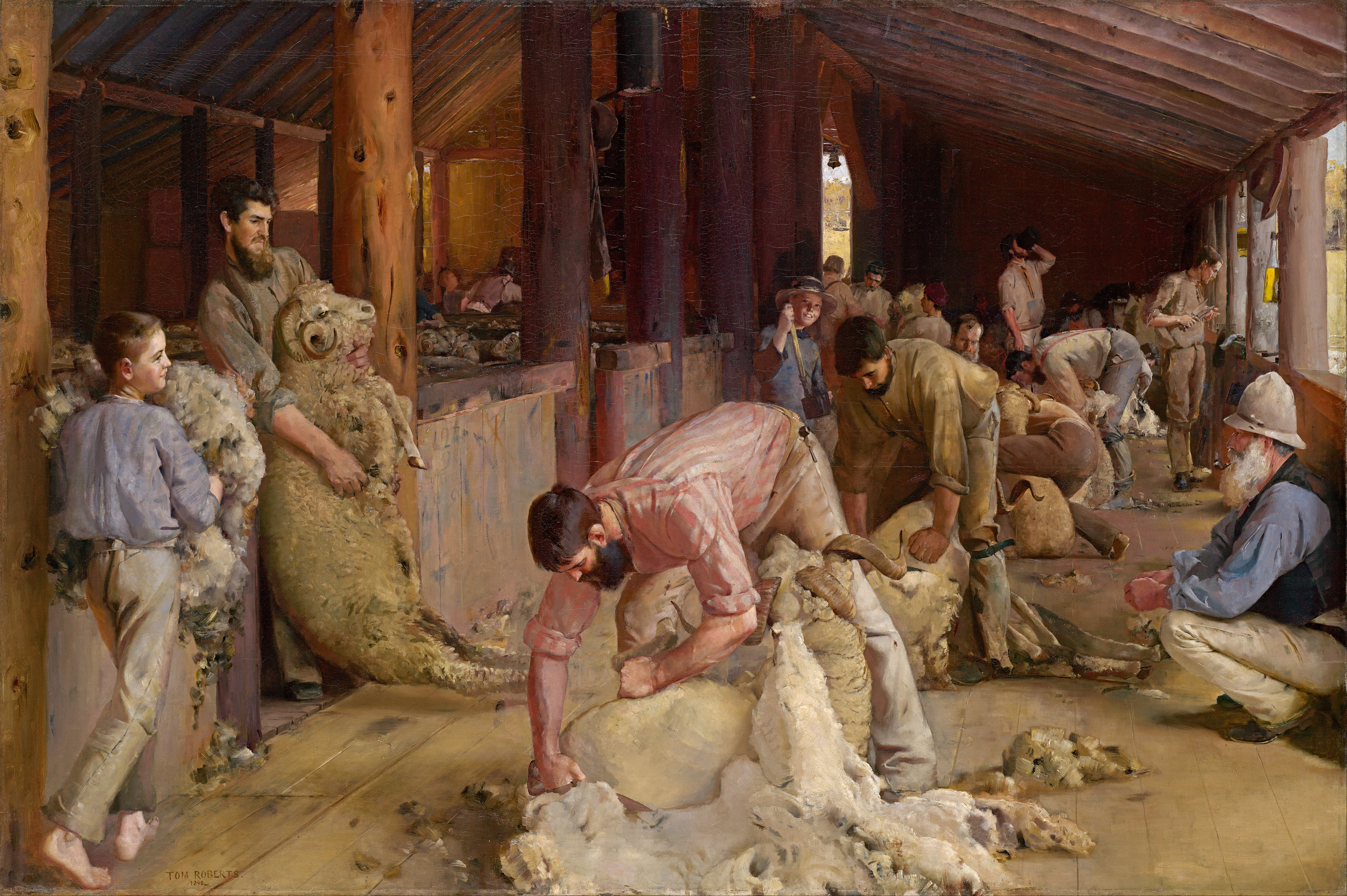
Shearing the rams by Tom Roberts depicting blade shearing in Australia

Shearing is said to be one of the oldest occupations, as people needed fiber to make garments. Originally sheep and other animals were shorn using sharp glass or metal taking tufts of fiber at a time to harvest the fiber but slowly man adapted scissor-like blades to make the job easier. Machine shearing was invented in the early 1880s and slowly took over as the main form of shearing, but there is still a place for blade shearing in certain environments and also as a sport.

== Equipment ==
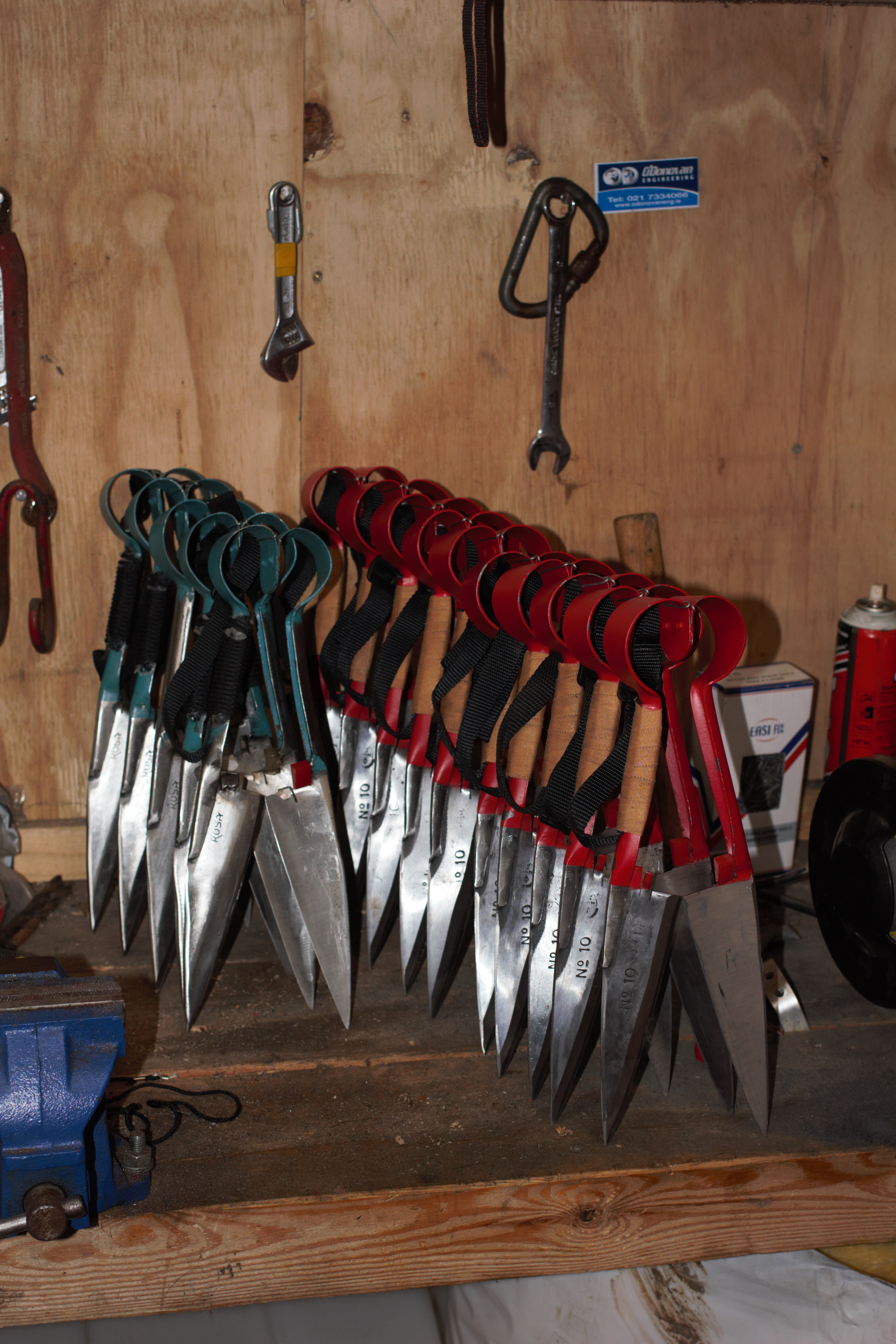
Blade shears that have been done up ready for use.

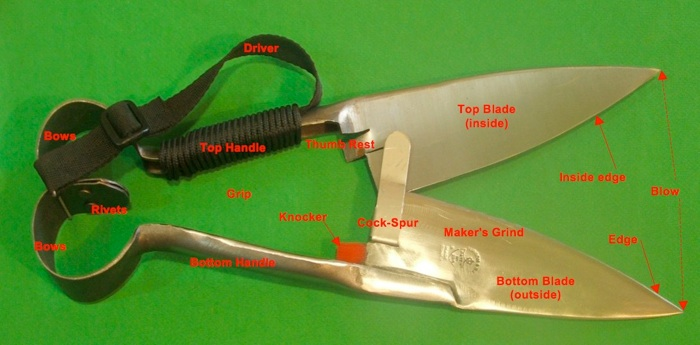
Blade shears with parts labeled

Blade shears are similar to scissors, and although most have the hinge at the back of the shears rather than the center, some still have the hinge in the center, e.g. Jakoti shears. More recent design improvements using a acetal bearing system fitted with superior wear resistant tool steel blades has greatly increased the longevity of the shears. Conventional blade shears can come with a single bow, double bows or inverse bows. Double bow shears are by far the most common as they are the most versatile. Single bow shears and inverse bowed shears offer more resistance and are mostly only used for tough shearing sheep. They come in varying lengths from about 10 cm (4 inches) to 18.5 cm (7.25 inches).

Most blade shears can be used straight from the factory. Traditional style shears on the other hand will give usually give a very rough cut and most people would not be able to shear for very long before wearing out their hand. Most blade shearers will either spend time 'doing up' their shears or buy already done up shears from other shearers. The process of doing up shears can take a couple of hours and consists of five main parts:

1. Pulling back: this is bending the blades back, usually with a special device called a "pull back", so that the shearer can take more wool with each 'blow'.
2. Grinding: This puts a hollow grind on the blade to making sharpening faster and easier. Most shearers will also grind the points sharper so the blades enter the wool more easily.
3. Cutting out: this is the process of cutting notches and spikes on the blades for a knocker, thumb rest, and cockspur.
4. Putting the driver on.
5. Setting: this involves bending and shaping the blades so they line up and cut against each other in an optimal way for ease of shearing.

Specialized equipment such as pull-backs and pendulums for grinders are used for some of the processes above which come at an expense and are a reason why many people buy shears from other shearers. Another reason people buy done-up shears is due to a lack of knowledge about doing-up shears, as many shearers in countries, like England, would only use a couple of pairs of shears in their life and would not spend the time learning how to do up shears for this.

Once the shears are done up the shearers will still maintain the edge regularly. In most commercial shearing, shearers will usually sharpen every one or two sheep to keep the edge honed in order to make shearing easier. Shearers will usually use a sharpening stone or laminated diamond stone to keep the edge on their shears. As the stoning bevel gets too thick shearers will grind back their shears to speed up the sharpening process.

== Occupational ==
=== New Zealand ===
In New Zealand, there are still approximately 40 commercial blade shearers who work between July and October each year. Between these shearers, 400,000 sheep are shorn each year in New Zealand, mostly in Otago and the Canterbury high country. Blade shearers in New Zealand usually travel to sheds in groups of 5 or 6 shearers and usually live on the station during shearing. Often they will stay on the station for up to a week shearing around 1000 sheep per day. Most of the sheep that are blade shorn in New Zealand are fine wooled Merino.

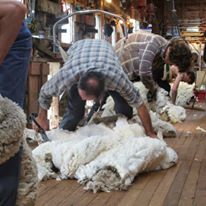
Shearers working on a station near Omarama, Otago, NZ

The main reason sheep are still blade shorn in New Zealand is due to the harsh climate at the time of shearing. Blade shearing leaves a thicker cover of wool on the sheep after shearing giving it more protection from storms and UV sunlight damage. Its also been claimed that the wool grows back faster after blade shearing than machine shearing.

=== South Africa ===
Around 17 million of the 29 million sheep in South Africa are still blade shorn today. Because shearers' wages are comparatively very low, equipment costs matter more—and a blade shearer's equipment costs around R2,000 compared to a shearing machine at around R15,000.

=== Australia ===
Most of the blade shearing in Australia is on stud farms, ewes and rams in order to leave more wool on the sheep or a more natural finish. Some farmers will also trim or shape their sheep using blade shears for showing at competitions.

=== The United Kingdom ===
In The United Kingdom there is still a small number of sheep blade shorn each year. Most of the sheep shorn are in Scotland or in rougher parts of the country where sheep have either been mustered late or they do not have the resources for machine shearing. Many people still also use blade shears for trimming or dagging their sheep. There are a lot of people in the UK who know how to blade shear but most would shear only a few sheep per year.

=== South America ===
There is still some blade shearing in South America for Alpaca, Llama and sheep. Blade shearing is used for sheep in parts of Patagonia where the weather can be very harsh and so the extra cover of wool left by blade shears is preferable.

== Sport ==
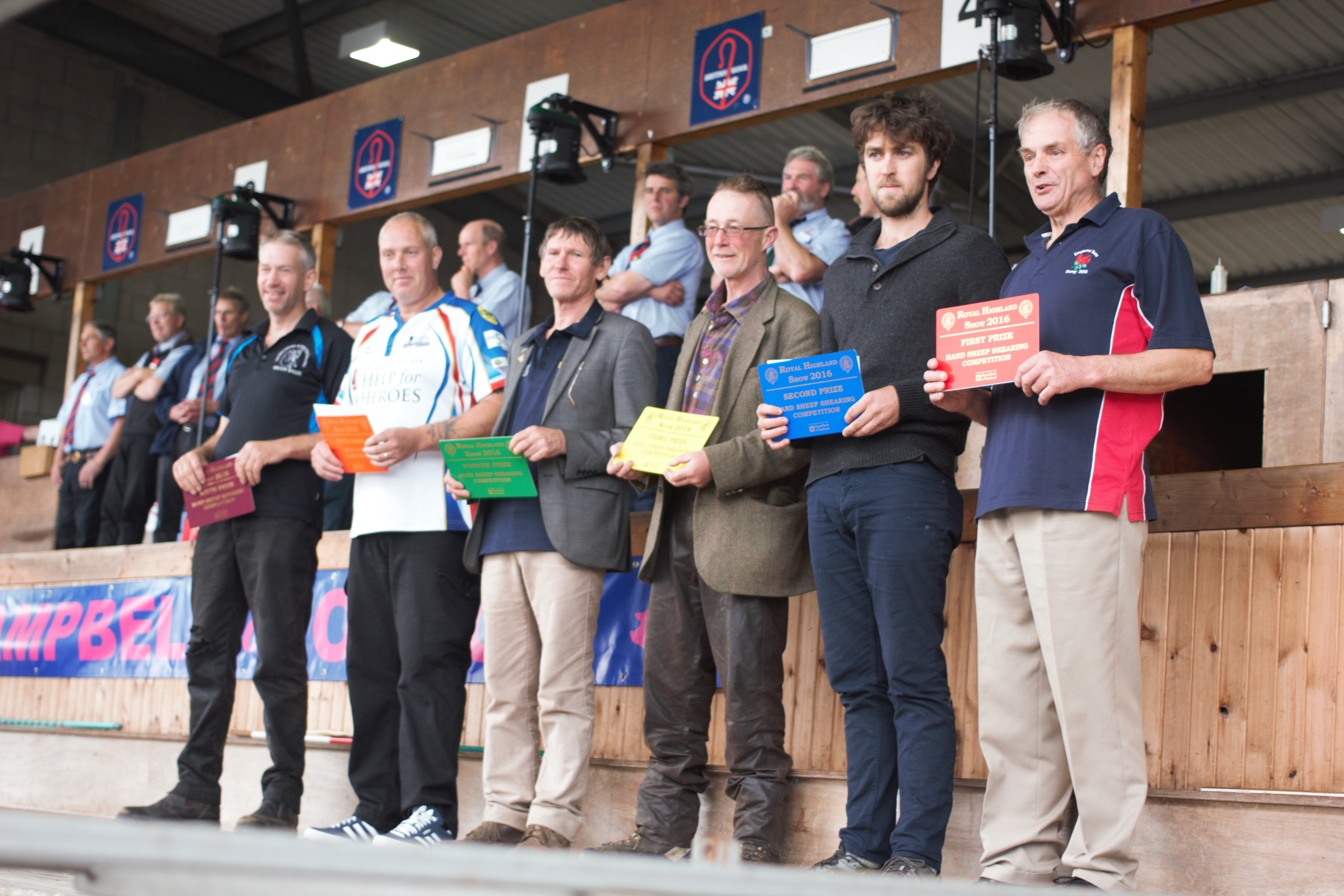
Blade shearing results at the royal highland show 2016

In blade shearing competitions, the competitors are not only judged on how fast they can shear but also how tidily they shear. International blade shearing rules stipulate that the sheep must have an even finish of 5-15mm of wool and shearers will be penalised for any skin cuts or any wool that is too short or too long. Shearers are also judged as they shear for any time they cut the wool twice, this is called a second cut. Shearers can also be penalized for rough handling of the sheep or allowing the sheep to escape their control during shearing.

Blade shearing as a sport has been through some ups and downs since the 1980s but in the last 2 or three years, it has increased in popularity. In the last 30 years many blade shearing competitions have been discontinued but now, with a resurgence of interest, the number of blade shearing competitions seems to be increasing. There were only 3 blade shearing competitions in Australia 25 years ago but that number has recently increased to at least 19 in 2019. In 2016, a show was created specifically for blade shearing and to promote the blade shearing circuit in the UK. In October 2016, the Boort show held a blade shearing competition with $3000 for first place, the largest prize for a blade shearing event in the world.

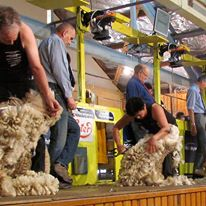
Blade shearers competing at The Waimate spring shears

The next big blade shearing competition is the world shearing championships in Scotland, June 2022. Blade shearers from at least 13 countries will be competing including Australia, South Africa, Japan, USA, France, Germany, Ireland, England and more. For the last 20 years, South Africa and Lesotho have dominated the world blade shearing championships. The most recent world champion is Allan Oldfield from New Zealand who won the title at Le Dorat in France in July 2019.

== Styles ==
Most commercial blade shearers in New Zealand and South Africa use a similar style of shearing to the traditional Bowen method used in machine shearing. The main differences are that in blade shearing the shearer takes less wool on the first leg of the sheep and they shear around the body of the sheep more than along the sheep.

In Australia Blade shearers usually shear around the sheep even more to leave a smoother finish. They even shear around the backbone instead of along it. This method is especially useful for when you are trying to leave a longer staple of wool on or on very skinny sheep with a high shoulder.

In several countries, they will tie up the sheep for shearing, this means that it is much easier to hold the sheep during shearing and means it cannot escape. This method is ok for less experienced shearers but is much slower so isn't suited for large mobs. There is a competition for this style of shearing at the Royal Welsh show each year
