= Skinner knife =

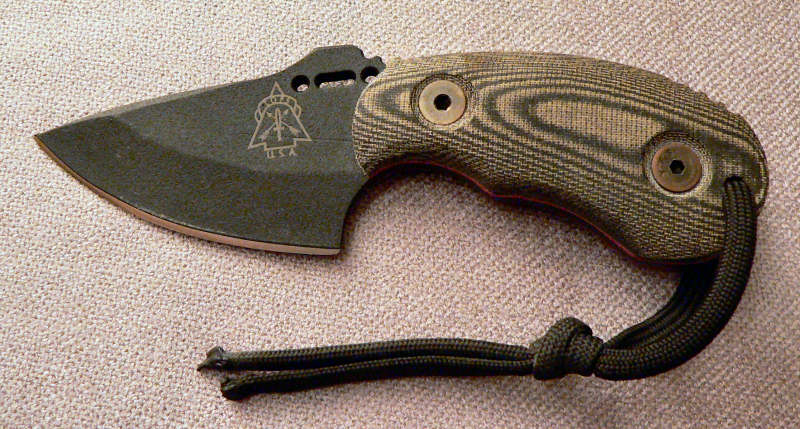
skinner knife

The skinner knife or skinning knife is a professional tool for a skinner. Typically a skinner knife has wide, short, curved blade. Skinning knives are more a tool than a weapon. Their curved shape was developed to minimize the risk of puncturing hides during the skinning process, and to allow for maximal use of the heel region of the blade.

== Use ==
Contrary to popular misconception, the tip region of the blade should ideally never be used for skinning. The user should use the heel region of the blade as much as possible, which also preserves the sharpness of the upper regions of the blade for far-reaching cuts, should they be required.

Skinning knives were a common item on the American frontier, often imported from Sheffield, England, and distributed by the Hudson's Bay Company. In the 1830s, skinning knives were also manufactured by Green River Works. Among frontiersmen, the saying "done up to Green River" signified the quality of something or their satisfaction with a trade deal.
