= Harry Harpham =

British politician

- Harpham speaking in the House of Commons in January 2016, three weeks before his death

Member of Parliament for Sheffield Brightside and Hillsborough
- In office 7 May 2015 – 4 February 2016
- Preceded by: David Blunkett
- Succeeded by: Gill Furniss

Personal details
- Born: Robert Harry Harpham; 21 February 1954 Mansfield, England
- Died: 4 February 2016 (aged 61)
- Party: Labour
- Spouse: Gill Furniss
- Education: Northern College; University of Sheffield
- Website: Official website

Robert Harry Harpham (21 February 1954 – 4 February 2016) was a British Labour Party politician and coal miner. He was the Member of Parliament (MP) for Sheffield Brightside and Hillsborough from the May 2015 general election until he died nine months later. He was succeeded by his widow, Gill Furniss, as the MP for the seat at the ensuing by-election.

== Early life and education ==
Harpham was born on 21 February 1954 in Mansfield, Nottinghamshire, England.

Harpham moved to Sheffield in 1985, and studied at Northern College in Barnsley and the University of Sheffield as a mature student. He graduated from Sheffield with a Bachelor's degree in 1991.

== Career ==
=== Early career ===
Harpham left school at 16, and became a coal miner at Clipstone Colliery. He took part in the miners' strike of 1984–85 as an NUM member, staying out for the duration.

=== Political career ===
In 2000, Harpham was elected to Sheffield City Council, serving as a councillor for Manor ward. He represented Darnall ward from 2004 onwards, and was deputy leader of the council from 2012. He did not stand at the 2015 council election.

Harpham was elected as the Member of Parliament (MP) for Sheffield Brightside and Hillsborough in the 2015 general election. He was one of the final deep coal miners ever to enter parliament. He was one of 125 MPs who employed a member of their family, in his case, employing his wife as a part-time researcher. He supported Andy Burnham in the 2015 Labour leadership election, in which Burnham came second to Jeremy Corbyn. He served as Parliamentary Private Secretary (PPS) to Lisa Nandy, then the shadow energy secretary in Corbyn's shadow cabinet. He was a Member of Parliament for 273 days, making him one of the shortest serving MPs.

== Personal life ==
Harpham had a son and a daughter from his first marriage. He was married to Gill Furniss until his death.

== Death ==
Harpham was diagnosed with terminal cancer in October 2015. He died on 4 February 2016, aged 61. On 16 February 2016, a non-religious funeral was held for him at Sheffield Cathedral. Harpham's widow Gill Furniss, a member of Sheffield City Council, won the by-election caused by his death as Labour's candidate.

== See also ==
- List of United Kingdom MPs with the shortest service

Parliament of the United Kingdom
Preceded by David Blunkett	Member of Parliament for Sheffield Brightside and Hillsborough; 2015–2016	Succeeded by Gill Furniss
