= 2014 Sheffield City Council election =

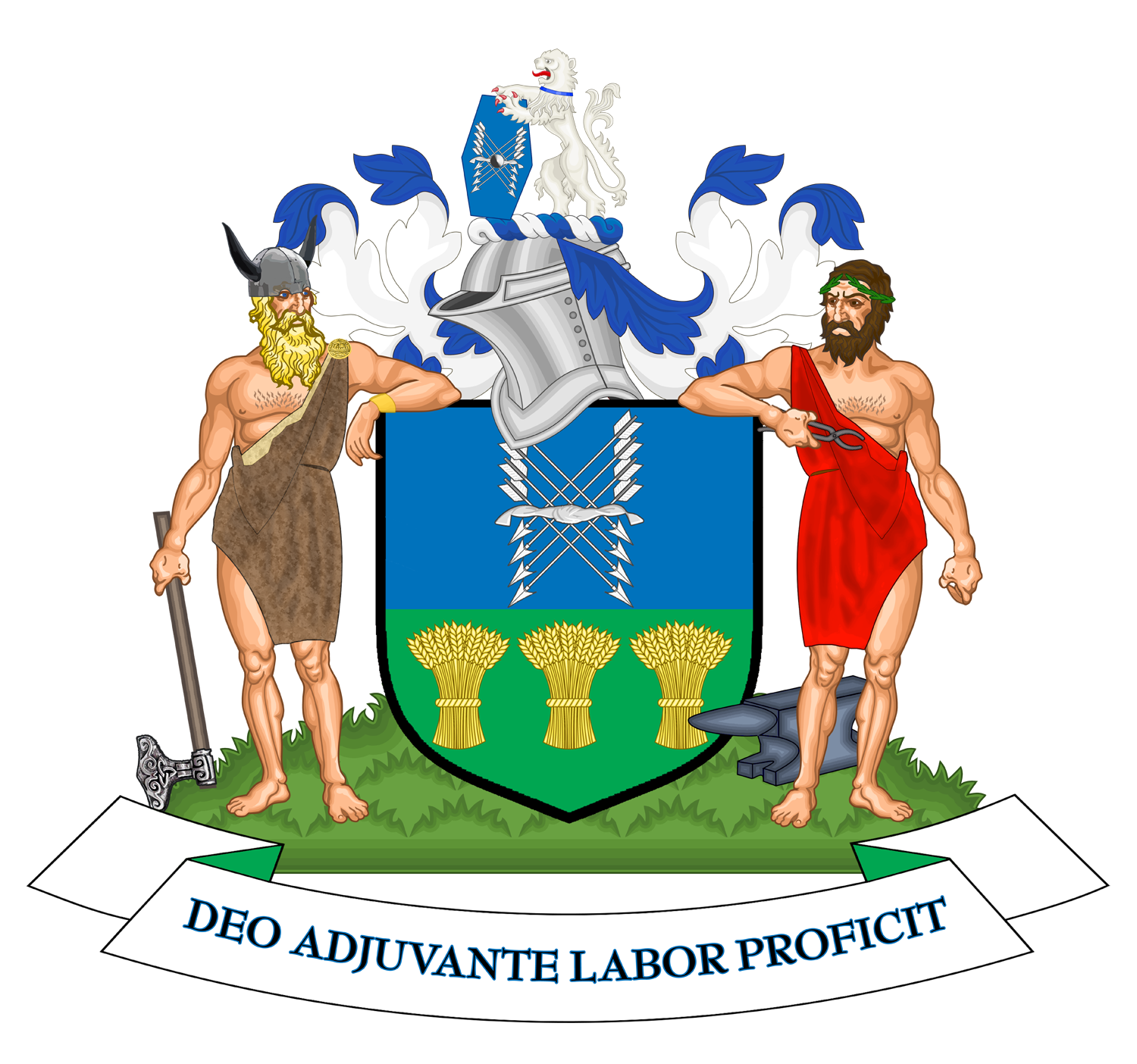
- 22 May 2014

29 of 84 seats to Sheffield City Council 43 seats needed for a majority
| | First party | Second party |
|---|---|---|
| Party | Labour | Liberal Democrats |
| Seats won | 18 | 6 |
| Seat change | ▼1 | ▼4 |
| | Third party | Fourth party |
| Party | UKIP | Green |
| Seats won | 3 | 2 |
| Seat change | ▲3 | ▲2 |
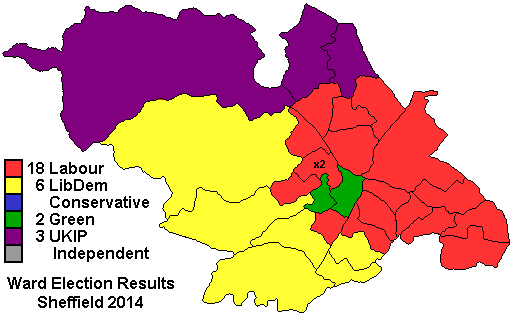
- Map showing the results of the 2014 Sheffield City Council elections.
Majority party before election
Labour
Majority party after election
Labour

Sheffield City Council elections took place on 22 May 2014, alongside nationwide local elections and European elections.

There were 29 seats up for election, one third of the council with a double vacancy in Walkley.

With a Labour majority of 36 and defending 19 seats, it was almost mathematically impossible for Labour to lose control of the council, as they would have needed to lose all 19 of those 19 seats to lose control. Even then, Labour would still have been the largest party.

== Election result ==
Sheffield City Council Election, 2014
| Party | Seats | Gains | Losses | Net gain/loss | Seats % | Votes % | Votes | +/− |
|---|---|---|---|---|---|---|---|---|
| Labour | 18 | 3 | 2 | +1 | 62.1 | 36.6 | 52,535 | -10.3 |
| UKIP | 3 | 3 | 0 | +3 | 10.3 | 23.0 | 32,988 | +12.5 |
| Liberal Democrats | 6 | 0 | 6 | -6 | 20.7 | 17.9 | 25,699 | -4.1 |
| Green | 2 | 2 | 0 | +2 | 6.9 | 12.6 | 18,078 | +2.2 |
| Conservative | 0 | 0 | 0 | 0 | 0.0 | 7.1 | 10,224 | -1.1 |
| TUSC | 0 | 0 | 0 | 0 | 0.0 | 1.8 | 2,657 | +0.8 |
| Independent | 0 | 0 | 0 | 0 | 0.0 | 1.0 | 1,496 | +0.1 |

The Labour Party gained one seat from their position following the 2010 election, but this included a seat already gained from the Liberal Democrats via defection in Walkley. Furthermore, another seat already gained from the Liberal Democrats via defection in Beauchief & Greenhill was regained by the Liberal Democrats.

This result had the following consequences for the total number of seats on the council after the elections:

| Party | Previous council | New council | +/- |
|---|---|---|---|
| Labour | 60 | 59 | ▼1 |
| Liberal Democrats | 22 | 18 | ▼4 |
| Greens | 2 | 4 | ▲2 |
| UKIP | 0 | 3 | ▲3 |
| Total | 84 | 84 | |
| Working majority | 36 | 34 | |

== Defections ==
Since 2010, when these seats were last contested, two Liberal Democrats had defected to Labour: Ben Curran in Walkley and Clive Skelton in Beauchief & Greenhill. The result in Stocksbridge & Upper Don was notable in that two former Liberal Democrat councillors stood for other parties. Martin Brelsford (defeated in 2011) stood as an independent, whilst Jack Clarkson (defeated in 2012) stood for UKIP.

== Ward results ==
=== Arbourthorne ===
Arbourthorne
| Party | Candidate | Votes | % | ±% |
|---|---|---|---|---|
| Labour | Jack Scott* | 1,604 | 41.7 | −20.6 |
| UKIP | Bob Sheridan | 1,190 | 30.9 | +16.2 |
| Conservative | Peter Smith | 327 | 8.5 | +0.4 |
| Green | Jennyfer Barnard | 289 | 7.5 | ±0.0 |
| TUSC | Alan Munro | 227 | 5.9 | N/A |
| Liberal Democrats | Susan Ross | 212 | 5.5 | −1.9 |
| Majority | | 414 | 10.8 | −36.8 |
| Turnout | | 3,849 | 28.2 | ±0.0 |
| Labour hold | | Swing | | |

=== Beauchief & Greenhill ===
Beauchief & Greenhill
| Party | Candidate | Votes | % | ±% |
|---|---|---|---|---|
| Liberal Democrats | Richard Shaw | 1,733 | 32.6 | +1.1 |
| Labour | Clive Skelton* | 1,520 | 28.6 | −17.3 |
| UKIP | Derek Spence | 1,259 | 23.7 | +13.4 |
| Conservative | Trevor Grant | 368 | 6.9 | +0.3 |
| Green | Paul Horada-Bradnum | 354 | 6.7 | +1.0 |
| TUSC | Terry Murphy | 78 | 1.5 | N/A |
| Majority | | 213 | 4.0 | N/A |
| Turnout | | 5,312 | 38.9 | +0.8 |
| Liberal Democrats hold | | Swing | | |

Beauchief & Greenhill was a regain for the Liberal Democrats, after the sitting councillor had defected to the Labour Party.

=== Beighton ===
Beighton
| Party | Candidate | Votes | % | ±% |
|---|---|---|---|---|
| Labour | Helen Mirfin-Boukouris* | 1,604 | 44.5 | −14.4 |
| UKIP | Sam Launder | 1,237 | 31.5 | +16.4 |
| Conservative | Shirley Clayton | 547 | 14.0 | +0.3 |
| Green | Richard Madden | 180 | 4.6 | ±0.0 |
| Liberal Democrats | Allan Wisbey | 156 | 4.0 | −3.7 |
| TUSC | Margaret Gray | 58 | 1.5 | N/A |
| Majority | | 414 | 13.0 | −30.9 |
| Turnout | | 3,921 | 29.6 | +0.2 |
| Labour hold | | Swing | | |

=== Birley ===
Birley
| Party | Candidate | Votes | % | ±% |
|---|---|---|---|---|
| Labour | Karen McGowan* | 1,944 | 45.7 | −17.5 |
| UKIP | Yvonne Sykes | 1,372 | 32.2 | +18.5 |
| Green | Frank Plunkett | 326 | 7.7 | +1.3 |
| Liberal Democrats | Wendy Jenrick | 309 | 7.3 | +1.0 |
| Conservative | Calum Heaton | 257 | 6.0 | −0.1 |
| TUSC | Dave Ross | 49 | 1.2 | N/A |
| Majority | | 572 | 13.5 | −36.0 |
| Turnout | | 4,257 | 33.0 | +1.6 |
| Labour hold | | Swing | | |

=== Broomhill ===
Broomhill
| Party | Candidate | Votes | % | ±% |
|---|---|---|---|---|
| Green | Brian Webster | 2,010 | 44.1 | +12.8 |
| Labour | Katherine Baker | 1,412 | 31.0 | −6.0 |
| Liberal Democrats | Harry Matthews | 501 | 11.0 | −11.3 |
| Conservative | Michael Ginn | 357 | 7.8 | +2.2 |
| UKIP | Pat Sullivan | 232 | 5.1 | +2.1 |
| TUSC | Rich Brown | 45 | 1.0 | N/A |
| Majority | | 598 | 13.1 | N/A |
| Turnout | | 4,557 | 35.0 | +8.4 |
| Green gain from Liberal Democrats | | Swing | | |

=== Burngreave ===
Burngreave
| Party | Candidate | Votes | % | ±% |
|---|---|---|---|---|
| Labour | Talib Hussain* | 3,193 | 60.6 | −6.6 |
| UKIP | Shane Harper | 894 | 17.0 | +11.6 |
| TUSC | Maxine Bowler | 443 | 8.4 | −5.7 |
| Green | Christopher Sisson | 327 | 6.2 | +1.3 |
| Conservative | Russell Cutts | 198 | 3.8 | +0.2 |
| Liberal Democrats | Barrie Jervis | 149 | 2.8 | −2.0 |
| Independent | Anwar Dirir | 65 | 1.2 | N/A |
| Majority | | 2,299 | 43.6 | −9.5 |
| Turnout | | 5,269 | 33.8 | +1.6 |
| Labour hold | | Swing | | |

=== Central ===
Central
| Party | Candidate | Votes | % | ±% |
|---|---|---|---|---|
| Green | Sarah Smalley | 2,552 | 48.7 | ±0.0 |
| Labour | Mohammed Maroof* | 2,029 | 38.7 | −0.4 |
| Conservative | Paul Wallace | 286 | 5.5 | +1.9 |
| Liberal Democrats | Muhammad Zahur | 182 | 3.5 | −2.0 |
| Independent | Jack Carrington | 120 | 2.3 | N/A |
| TUSC | Dan Celardi | 75 | 1.4 | N/A |
| Majority | | 523 | 10.0 | +0.3 |
| Turnout | | 5,244 | 26.8 | +5.5 |
| Green gain from Labour | | Swing | | |

=== Crookes ===
Crookes
| Party | Candidate | Votes | % | ±% |
|---|---|---|---|---|
| Labour | Anne Murphy | 2,103 | 32.1 | +6.9 |
| Liberal Democrats | Shaffaq Mohammed** | 1,833 | 28.0 | −7.0 |
| Green | Jonathan Peters | 1,141 | 17.4 | +3.0 |
| UKIP | John Clapham | 840 | 12.8 | +7.0 |
| Independent | John Hesketh | 549 | 8.4 | −4.7 |
| TUSC | Nick Hall | 86 | 1.3 | N/A |
| Majority | | 270 | 4.1 | N/A |
| Turnout | | 6,552 | 47.6 | +7.4 |
| Labour gain from Liberal Democrats | | Swing | | |

Shaffaq Mohammed was a sitting councillor for Broomhill ward.

=== Darnall ===
Darnall
| Party | Candidate | Votes | % | ±% |
|---|---|---|---|---|
| Labour | Mazher Iqbal* | 2,824 | 48.6 | −8.0 |
| UKIP | Charlotte Arnott | 1,468 | 25.3 | +14.7 |
| Liberal Democrats | Salim Zaman | 770 | 13.3 | −8.5 |
| Conservative | Anton Balint | 481 | 8.3 | +5.5 |
| Green | Adrian Hawley | 156 | 2.7 | −1.3 |
| TUSC | Philip King | 108 | 1.9 | N/A |
| Majority | | 1,356 | 23.3 | −11.5 |
| Turnout | | 5,807 | 36.0 | +1.9 |
| Labour hold | | Swing | | |

=== Dore & Totley ===
Dore & Totley
| Party | Candidate | Votes | % | ±% |
|---|---|---|---|---|
| Liberal Democrats | Martin Smith | 2,452 | 39.6 | −1.8 |
| Conservative | Alex Dale | 1,603 | 25.9 | −8.1 |
| UKIP | Jason Sullivan | 861 | 13.9 | N/A |
| Labour | David Crosby | 842 | 13.6 | +1.5 |
| Green | Rita Wilcock | 437 | 7.1 | +0.4 |
| Majority | | 849 | 13.7 | +6.2 |
| Turnout | | 6,195 | 46.1 | −0.9 |
| Liberal Democrats hold | | Swing | | |

=== East Ecclesfield ===
East Ecclesfield
| Party | Candidate | Votes | % | ±% |
|---|---|---|---|---|
| UKIP | Pauline Andrews | 1,838 | 36.3 | +24.8 |
| Labour | Garry Weatherall* | 1,647 | 32.5 | −20.5 |
| Liberal Democrats | Colin Taylor | 960 | 18.9 | −5.4 |
| Conservative | Hillary Gay | 341 | 6.7 | +1.1 |
| Green | Kaye Horsfield | 284 | 5.6 | ±0.0 |
| Majority | | 191 | 3.8 | N/A |
| Turnout | | 5,070 | 35.2 | +1.9 |
| UKIP gain from Labour | | Swing | | |

=== Ecclesall ===
Ecclesall
| Party | Candidate | Votes | % | ±% |
|---|---|---|---|---|
| Liberal Democrats | Roger Davison* | 2,831 | 40.8 | +1.5 |
| Labour | Lewis Dagnall | 1,620 | 23.3 | −2.1 |
| Green | Arun Mathur | 1,007 | 14.5 | −0.5 |
| Conservative | Christina Stark | 792 | 11.4 | −2.5 |
| UKIP | Josh Wright | 694 | 10.0 | +3.5 |
| Majority | | 849 | 17.5 | +3.6 |
| Turnout | | 6,944 | 46.9 | +3.5 |
| Liberal Democrats hold | | Swing | | |

=== Firth Park ===
Firth Park
| Party | Candidate | Votes | % | ±% |
|---|---|---|---|---|
| Labour | Alan Law* | 2,081 | 44.5 | −25.2 |
| UKIP | John Trow | 1,607 | 36.7 | +24.1 |
| Green | Amy Mack | 248 | 5.7 | −2.5 |
| Conservative | Judith Burkinshaw | 231 | 5.3 | +0.3 |
| Liberal Democrats | Thomas Mead | 150 | 3.4 | −1.1 |
| TUSC | Sam Bennett | 67 | 1.5 | N/A |
| Majority | | 474 | 10.8 | −46.3 |
| Turnout | | 4,384 | 30.1 | +3.5 |
| Labour hold | | Swing | | |

=== Fulwood ===
Fulwood
| Party | Candidate | Votes | % | ±% |
|---|---|---|---|---|
| Liberal Democrats | Cliff Woodcraft* | 2,577 | 40.5 | +1.9 |
| Labour | Dianne Hurst | 1,196 | 18.8 | +0.3 |
| Conservative | Ian Walker | 966 | 15.2 | −8.8 |
| Green | Judith Rutnam | 963 | 15.1 | +1.9 |
| UKIP | Nigel James | 587 | 9.2 | +3.5 |
| TUSC | Christopher McAndrew | 78 | 1.2 | N/A |
| Majority | | 1,381 | 21.7 | +7.1 |
| Turnout | | 6,367 | 44.1 | +5.5 |
| Liberal Democrats hold | | Swing | | |

=== Gleadless Valley ===
Gleadless Valley
| Party | Candidate | Votes | % | ±% |
|---|---|---|---|---|
| Labour | Cate McDonald* | 2,190 | 41.3 | −15.2 |
| UKIP | Martin Laurie | 1,176 | 22.2 | +13.4 |
| Green | Peter Garbutt | 1,026 | 19.3 | +3.6 |
| Liberal Democrats | Philip Shaddock | 408 | 7.7 | −2.4 |
| Conservative | Jenny Grant | 280 | 5.3 | +0.1 |
| TUSC | Elizabeth Morton | 229 | 4.3 | +0.6 |
| Majority | | 1,014 | 19.1 | −21.7 |
| Turnout | | 5,309 | 36.7 | +3.5 |
| Labour hold | | Swing | | |

=== Graves Park ===
Graves Park
| Party | Candidate | Votes | % | ±% |
|---|---|---|---|---|
| Liberal Democrats | Steve Ayris | 2,014 | 35.3 | −3.9 |
| Labour | Bob Pemberton | 1,685 | 29.5 | −7.9 |
| UKIP | Will Gates | 1,040 | 18.2 | +10.7 |
| Green | David Hayes | 512 | 9.0 | +1.6 |
| Conservative | David Woodger | 355 | 6.2 | −0.2 |
| TUSC | Keith Endean | 101 | 1.8 | −0.4 |
| Majority | | 329 | 5.8 | +3.9 |
| Turnout | | 5,707 | 42.7 | +2.9 |
| Liberal Democrats hold | | Swing | | |

=== Hillsborough ===
Hillsborough
| Party | Candidate | Votes | % | ±% |
|---|---|---|---|---|
| Labour | Josie Paszek | 2,231 | 43.0 | −10.3 |
| UKIP | John Kendall | 1,531 | 29.5 | +17.0 |
| Green | Chris McMahon | 702 | 13.5 | +2.9 |
| Liberal Democrats | Joe Warburton | 615 | 11.8 | −2.3 |
| TUSC | Wyllie Hume | 113 | 2.2 | −0.7 |
| Majority | | 700 | 13.5 | −24.8 |
| Turnout | | 5,192 | 37.2 | +4.4 |
| Labour hold | | Swing | | |

=== Manor Castle ===
Manor Castle
| Party | Candidate | Votes | % | ±% |
|---|---|---|---|---|
| Labour | Terry Fox* | 2,093 | 59.7 | −12.4 |
| Green | Graham Wroe | 580 | 16.5 | +7.7 |
| TUSC | Alistair Tice | 356 | 10.2 | N/A |
| Conservative | Jack McGill | 288 | 8.2 | +4.8 |
| Liberal Democrats | Michael Shaw | 189 | 5.4 | −0.4 |
| Majority | | 1,513 | 43.2 | −18.9 |
| Turnout | | 3,506 | 25.7 | +2.5 |
| Labour hold | | Swing | | |

=== Mosborough ===
Mosborough
| Party | Candidate | Votes | % | ±% |
|---|---|---|---|---|
| Labour | Isobel Bowler* | 1,844 | 39.9 | −14.2 |
| UKIP | Joanne Parkin | 1,414 | 30.6 | +19.2 |
| Liberal Democrats | Gail Smith | 620 | 13.4 | −11.0 |
| Conservative | William Lockwood | 492 | 10.6 | +4.1 |
| Green | Julie White | 205 | 4.4 | +0.8 |
| TUSC | Ian Whitehouse | 52 | 1.1 | N/A |
| Majority | | 430 | 9.3 | −20.3 |
| Turnout | | 4,627 | 33.7 | +0.5 |
| Labour hold | | Swing | | |

=== Nether Edge ===
Nether Edge
| Party | Candidate | Votes | % | ±% |
|---|---|---|---|---|
| Labour | Nasima Akther | 2,479 | 39.8 | −7.4 |
| Green | Anne Barr | 1,417 | 22.8 | +4.4 |
| Liberal Democrats | Javid Khan | 1,411 | 22.7 | −3.5 |
| UKIP | Jeffrey Shaw | 448 | 7.2 | +3.0 |
| Conservative | Marc Cooklin | 360 | 5.8 | +1.7 |
| TUSC | James Williams | 113 | 1.8 | N/A |
| Majority | | 1,062 | 17.0 | −4.0 |
| Turnout | | 6,228 | 46.6 | +6.2 |
| Labour gain from Liberal Democrats | | Swing | | |

=== Richmond ===
Richmond
| Party | Candidate | Votes | % | ±% |
|---|---|---|---|---|
| Labour | Paul Wood | 1,885 | 45.0 | −19.8 |
| UKIP | Jean Simpson | 1,544 | 36.9 | +21.1 |
| Conservative | Andrew Sneddon | 295 | 7.0 | +0.7 |
| Green | Richard Roper | 204 | 4.9 | −1.1 |
| Liberal Democrats | Angela Hill | 189 | 4.5 | −2.5 |
| TUSC | Sam Morecroft | 68 | 1.6 | N/A |
| Majority | | 341 | 8.1 | −40.9 |
| Turnout | | 4,185 | 31.6 | +3.5 |
| Labour hold | | Swing | | |

=== Shiregreen & Brightside ===
Shiregreen & Brightside
| Party | Candidate | Votes | % | ±% |
|---|---|---|---|---|
| Labour | Peter Rippon* | 2,050 | 45.9 | −21.4 |
| UKIP | Mark Price | 1,806 | 40.4 | +22.6 |
| Conservative | James Anderson | 244 | 5.5 | ±0.0 |
| Green | Douglas Johnson | 242 | 5.4 | −0.6 |
| Liberal Democrats | Jack Weston | 123 | 2.8 | −0.6 |
| Majority | | 244 | 5.5 | −44.0 |
| Turnout | | 4,465 | 31.1 | +5.9 |
| Labour hold | | Swing | | |

=== Southey ===
Southey
| Party | Candidate | Votes | % | ±% |
|---|---|---|---|---|
| Labour | Gill Furniss* | 1,657 | 44.4 | −26.3 |
| UKIP | Mike Simpson | 1,450 | 38.9 | +26.0 |
| Conservative | Dehenna Davison | 236 | 6.3 | +0.9 |
| Green | Eamonn Ward | 183 | 4.9 | −0.8 |
| Liberal Democrats | Marcus Foster | 139 | 3.7 | −1.7 |
| TUSC | Matt Curtis | 63 | 1.7 | N/A |
| Majority | | 207 | 5.5 | −52.3 |
| Turnout | | 3,728 | 27.4 | +2.8 |
| Labour hold | | Swing | | |

=== Stannington ===
Stannington
| Party | Candidate | Votes | % | ±% |
|---|---|---|---|---|
| Liberal Democrats | David Baker* | 2,441 | 39.9 | −0.6 |
| Labour | Ben Miskell | 1,652 | 27.0 | −8.4 |
| UKIP | John Greenfield | 1,567 | 25.6 | +14.7 |
| Green | Martin Bradshaw | 391 | 6.4 | −0.9 |
| TUSC | Jeremy Short | 66 | 1.1 | N/A |
| Majority | | 789 | 12.9 | +7.7 |
| Turnout | | 6,117 | 42.3 | +3.6 |
| Liberal Democrats hold | | Swing | | |

=== Stocksbridge & Upper Don ===
Stocksbridge & Upper Don
| Party | Candidate | Votes | % | ±% |
|---|---|---|---|---|
| UKIP | Jack Clarkson | 2,496 | 44.4 | +16.9 |
| Labour | Lisa Banes | 1,207 | 21.5 | −13.6 |
| Conservative | Nigel Owen | 621 | 11.0 | +2.9 |
| Independent | Martin Brelsford | 526 | 9.4 | N/A |
| Green | Dan Lyons | 419 | 7.5 | +2.3 |
| Liberal Democrats | Sue Auckland | 353 | 6.3 | −17.9 |
| Majority | | 1,289 | 22.9 | N/A |
| Turnout | | 5,622 | 38.8 | +4.2 |
| UKIP gain from Liberal Democrats | | Swing | | |

Jack Clarkson's change in share of the vote is calculated from the UKIP candidate in 2012. His vote increased by 20.2% from his own performance as a Liberal Democrat.

=== Walkley ===
Walkley
| Party | Candidate | Votes | % | ±% |
|---|---|---|---|---|
| Labour | Ben Curran* | 2,297 | 44.0 | −6.0 |
| Labour | Olivia Blake | 2,061 | 39.5 | −10.5 |
| Green | Sue Morton | 1,257 | 24.1 | +11.5 |
| Liberal Democrats | Diane Leek | 981 | 18.8 | −4.5 |
| UKIP | Richard Ratcliffe | 870 | 16.7 | +8.9 |
| UKIP | Josh Skipworth | 787 | 15.1 | +7.3 |
| Green | Calvin Payne | 738 | 14.1 | +1.5 |
| Liberal Democrats | Jonathan Harston | 710 | 13.6 | −9.7 |
| Conservative | Lorna Hurley | 299 | 5.7 | +2.1 |
| Conservative | Philip Hurley | 259 | 5.0 | +1.4 |
| TUSC | Chaz Lockett | 182 | 3.5 | +0.8 |
| Majority | | 804 | 15.4 | −11.3 |
| Turnout | | 5,221 | 36.0 | +2.5 |
| Labour gain from Liberal Democrats | | Swing | | |
| Labour hold | | Swing | | |

The result in Walkley did not change the numbers on the council, as the sitting Liberal Democrat councillor had previously defected to Labour.

=== West Ecclesfield ===
West Ecclesfield
| Party | Candidate | Votes | % | ±% |
|---|---|---|---|---|
| UKIP | John Booker | 1,929 | 37.4 | +26.5 |
| Labour | Zoe Sykes | 1,656 | 32.1 | −8.4 |
| Liberal Democrats | Victoria Bowden | 1,054 | 20.4 | −14.9 |
| Green | Kathryn Aston | 281 | 5.4 | +2.0 |
| Independent | David Ogle | 236 | 4.6 | −0.9 |
| Majority | | 273 | 5.3 | N/A |
| Turnout | | 5,156 | 36.0 | +1.3 |
| UKIP gain from Liberal Democrats | | Swing | | |

=== Woodhouse ===
Woodhouse
| Party | Candidate | Votes | % | ±% |
|---|---|---|---|---|
| Labour | Ray Satur* | 1,851 | 43.9 | −16.3 |
| UKIP | Lewis Sinclair | 1,638 | 38.8 | +16.7 |
| Green | John Grant | 385 | 9.1 | +3.3 |
| Liberal Democrats | Leslie Abrahams | 347 | 8.2 | +1.7 |
| Majority | | 213 | 5.1 | −33.0 |
| Turnout | | 4,221 | 31.2 | +1.4 |
| Labour hold | | Swing | | |
