= David Blunkett =

British politician (born 1947)

The Right Honourable The Lord Blunkett PC FAcSS
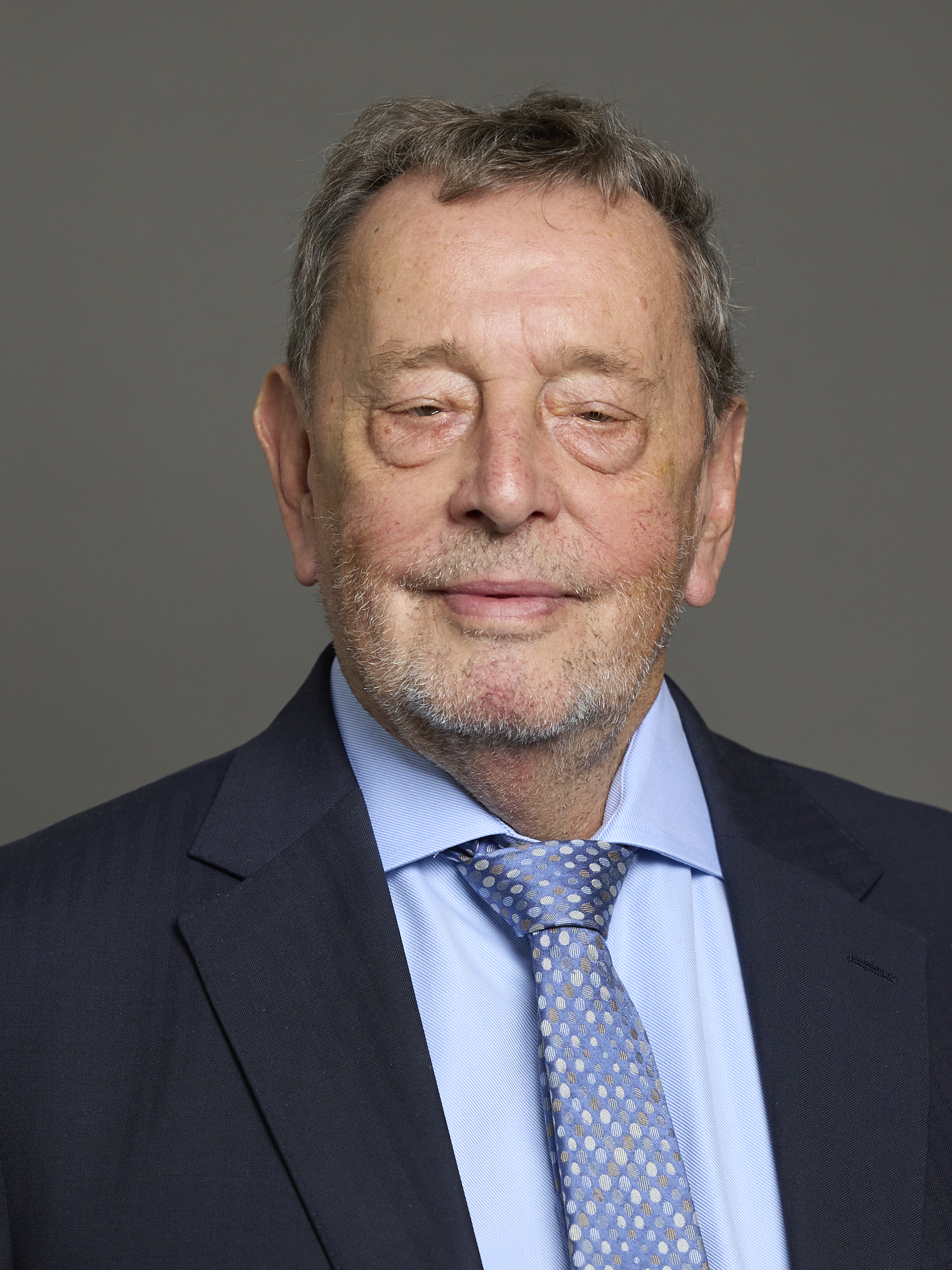
- Official portrait, 2025

Secretary of State for Work and Pensions
- In office 6 May 2005 – 2 November 2005
- Prime Minister: Tony Blair
- Preceded by: Alan Johnson
- Succeeded by: John Hutton

Home Secretary
- In office 8 June 2001 – 15 December 2004
- Prime Minister: Tony Blair
- Preceded by: Jack Straw
- Succeeded by: Charles Clarke

Secretary of State for Education and Employment
- In office 2 May 1997 – 8 June 2001
- Prime Minister: Tony Blair
- Preceded by: Gillian Shephard
- Succeeded by: Estelle Morris
Shadow Cabinet offices 1992–1997
Shadow Secretary of State for Education and Employment
In office 20 October 1994 – 2 May 1997
Leader	Tony Blair
Preceded by	Ann Taylor
Succeeded by	Gillian Shephard
Shadow Secretary of State for Health
In office 18 July 1992 – 20 October 1994
Leader	John Smith; Margaret Beckett (Acting)
Preceded by	Robin Cook
Succeeded by	Margaret Beckett

Member of the House of Lords
- Lord Temporal
- Life peerage 28 September 2015

Member of Parliament for Sheffield Brightside and Hillsborough Sheffield Brightside (1987–2010)
- In office 11 June 1987 – 30 March 2015
- Preceded by: Joan Maynard
- Succeeded by: Harry Harpham

Leader of Sheffield City Council
- In office 1980 – 11 June 1987
- Deputy: Alan Billings
- Preceded by: George Wilson
- Succeeded by: Clive Betts

Member of Sheffield City Council for Southey Green
- In office 8 May 1970 – 1987
- Preceded by: Winifred Golding

Personal details
- Born: 6 June 1947 (age 79) Sheffield, England
- Party: Labour
- Spouses: Ruth Mitchell (m. 1970; div. 1990) Margaret Williams (m. 2009)
- Children: 4
- Education: University of Sheffield (BA)
- Website: members.parliament.uk/member/395/contact
- David Blunkett's voice Blunkett on occupational health and safety Recorded 20 October 2017

David Blunkett, Baron Blunkett, PC (born 6 June 1947) is a British politician who served as Secretary of State for Education and Employment from 1997 to 2001, Home Secretary from 2001 to 2004 and Secretary of State for Work and Pensions in 2005. A member of the Labour Party, he served as Member of Parliament (MP) for Sheffield Brightside and Hillsborough (formerly Sheffield Brightside) from 1987 to 2015 and was appointed to the House of Lords as a life peer in 2015.

Following the 2001 general election, he was promoted to home secretary, a position he held until 2004, when he resigned following publicity about his personal life. Following the 2005 general election he was appointed secretary of state for work and pensions, though he resigned from that role later that year following media coverage relating to external business interests in the period when he did not hold a cabinet post. The Cabinet secretary Gus O'Donnell, in a letter of 25 November 2005, exonerated him from any wrongdoing.

On 20 June 2014, Blunkett announced to his constituency party that he would be standing down from the House of Commons at the next general election in May 2015. In August 2015, he was awarded a peerage in the 2015 Dissolution Honours. He was created Baron Blunkett, of Brightside and Hillsborough in the City of Sheffield, on 28 September.

== Early life ==
Blunkett was born on 6 June 1947 at Jessop Hospital, Sheffield, West Riding of Yorkshire, with improperly developed optic nerves due to a rare genetic disorder. He grew up in an underprivileged family; in 1959 he endured a family tragedy when his father was gravely injured in an industrial accident: he fell into a vat of boiling water while at work as a foreman for the East Midlands Gas Board, dying a month later. This left the surviving family in poverty, especially since the board refused to pay compensation for two years because his father worked past the retirement age, dying at the age of 67.

Blunkett was educated at schools for the blind in Sheffield and Shrewsbury. He attended the Royal National College for the Blind. He was apparently told at school that one of his few options in life was to become a lathe operator. Nevertheless, he won a place at the University of Sheffield, where he gained a BA honours degree in Political Theory and Institutions; one of his lecturers was Bernard Crick. He entered local politics on graduation, whilst gaining a Postgraduate Certificate in Education from Huddersfield Holly Bank College of Education (now part of the University of Huddersfield). He spent a total of six years going to evening classes and day-release classes to get the qualifications needed to go to university. He worked as a clerk typist between 1967 and 1969 and as a lecturer in industrial relations and politics between 1973 and 1981.

By 1970, Blunkett was a Methodist local preacher based at Southey church in the Sheffield (North) Methodist circuit. He told the Methodist Recorder: "My politics come directly from my religion. As a Christian I see myself as a Socialist; not exactly a Donald Soper, but that way inclined".

In 1970, he was engaged to Ruth Mitchell and they married in July of that year.

== Local government ==
In 1970, at the age of 22, Blunkett became the youngest-ever councillor on Sheffield City Council and in Britain, being elected while a mature student. He was elected on the same day as fellow Labour member Bill Michie, who, like Blunkett, would go on to serve as a Sheffield MP. Blunkett served on Sheffield City Council from 1970 to 1988, and was leader from 1980 to 1987. He also served on South Yorkshire County Council from 1973 to 1977. This was a time of decline for Sheffield's steel industry. Blunkett and Michie were among what political journalist Julia Langdon has described as "an energetic group of young Labour activists who emerged in Sheffield in the 1970s, a number of whom moved on to Westminster". The Conservative MP for Sheffield Hallam, Irvine Patnick, coined the phrase "Socialist Republic of South Yorkshire" to describe the left-wing politics of its local government. Although bestowed as a criticism of the radical policies being pursued by Labour councillors in the area, Langdon notes that it "was in fact happily embraced by those it was intended to denigrate".

Sheffield City Council supported the National Union of Mineworkers in their 1984–85 strike, designated Sheffield a "nuclear-free zone", and set up an Anti-Apartheid Working Party. Blunkett became known as the leader of one of Labour's left-wing councils, sometimes described pejoratively as "loony left". Blunkett was one of the faces of the protest over rate-capping in 1985 which saw several Labour councils refuse to set a budget in a protest against Government powers to restrain their spending. He built up support within the Labour Party during his time as the council's leader during the 1980s, and was elected to the Labour Party's National Executive Committee.

== Parliamentary career ==
Having unsuccessfully fought Sheffield Hallam in February 1974, at the 1987 general election, Blunkett was elected member of parliament (MP) for Sheffield Brightside with a large majority in a safe Labour seat. He became a party spokesman on local government, joined the shadow cabinet in 1992 as shadow health secretary and became shadow education secretary in 1994.

=== Education and employment secretary ===
Following Labour's landslide victory in the 1997 general election, he became secretary of state for education and employment, thus becoming Britain's first blind cabinet minister (Henry Fawcett, husband of suffragist Millicent Fawcett, had been a member of the Privy Council, of which the Cabinet is the executive committee, more than a century before). The role of education secretary was a vital one in a government whose prime minister had in 1996 described his priorities as "education, education, education" and which had made reductions in school class sizes a pledge.

As secretary of state, Blunkett pursued substantial reforms, ready to take on the teaching unions and determined to ensure basic standards of literacy and numeracy. He was rewarded with extra funding to cut class sizes, notably by abolishing the Assisted Places Scheme. A key pillar of Blunkett's work as education secretary was the introduction of Sure Start, a government programme which provided services for pre-school children and their families. It works to bring together early education, childcare, health and family support. In 2011, the government effectively started the abolition of Sure Start by lifting the ring fence on earmarked funding and cutting back drastically on the funds available.

Following the Dearing Report into higher education, Blunkett introduced the Teaching and Higher Education Act 1998 on 26 November 1997, which introduced university tuition fees. He also led the massive expansion in higher education. He provided large scale investment in universities in the UK and one study, published in 2011, showed that universities are now educating more than one-quarter more students than they did previously, and receiving double the income.

Whilst in this position, Blunkett also launched Learning and Skills Councils, created Jobcentre Plus and had responsibility for the Equal Opportunities Commission, as well as establishing the Disability Rights Commission (as home secretary, he was also responsible for the Commission on Racial Equality; all three of these bodies were incorporated later into the Equality and Human Rights Commission).

In 1999, Blunkett proposed that sex education should be "age appropriate", reportedly arguing that childhood, the "age of innocence", should not be compromised by "graphic" sex education. In 2000, while attempting to cool opposition to the proposed abolition of the Local Government Act 1988's Section 28, he issued guidelines on the importance of 'family values' in teaching children sex education.

Blunkett introduced the teaching of citizenship in schools in 1999, arguing that "We want to ensure that there's a basis of traditional knowledge that's available to all children." Citizenship education provides pupils with the knowledge, skills and understanding to become informed citizens, aware of their rights, duties and responsibilities.

=== Home secretary ===
At the start of the Labour government's second term in 2001, Blunkett was promoted to home secretary, fulfilling an ambition of his. Some observers saw him a rival to Chancellor of the Exchequer Gordon Brown in succeeding Blair as prime minister.

Blunkett was almost immediately faced with the September 11 attacks on the United States. He brought in new anti-terrorism measures, including detention without trial of suspect foreign nationals who could not be extradited or deported. It caused a backbench rebellion and provoked strong opposition in the House of Lords; Blunkett made concessions over incitement to religious hatred (later carried through by his successor) and to introduce a "sunset clause". He authorised MI5 to start collecting bulk telephone communications data on which telephone numbers called each other under a general power brought in by the Telecommunications Act 1984.

As home secretary, Blunkett was prepared to confront the judiciary and the police, with proposals for civilian community patrols and changes to police officers' pay and working conditions. More than 7,000 police demonstrated outside Parliament in 2002.

During his term in office, the large upsurge in asylum claims was reversed, the Sangatte refugee camp on French soil was closed, and refugees numbers subsequently dropped from 110,000 to less than 30,000. With an additional 15,000 police officers and 6,500 Community Support Officers by 2004, crime had reached an all-time low, with over a 40% drop from ten years earlier.

A controversial area for Blunkett was civil liberties, and he described civil libertarianism as "airy fairy". As education secretary, he had repeatedly expressed the intention that, were he to become home secretary, he would make the then-incumbent Jack Straw, who had been criticised for being hard-line, seem over-liberal. In 2006, Martin Narey, the former director general of the prison service, claimed that Blunkett had once told him to use the army and machine guns to deal with rioting prisoners. Blunkett has denied these allegations.

Blunkett radically overhauled sexual offences legislation, via the Sexual Offences Act 2003, changing laws governing homosexuality, whilst improving protections against rapists, paedophiles and other sex offenders. The act closed a loophole that had allowed those accused of child rape to escape punishment by arguing the act was consensual, and a new offence of adult sexual activity with a child – which covers any sex act that takes place between an adult and a child under 16 – was introduced. It was supported by all major political parties in the UK.

In 2004, it emerged that Blunkett had directed Home Office civil servants to closely monitor and counter the findings of Migration Watch UK, which controversially included manipulating the timing of statistical releases to avoid criticism from the pressure group.

Blunkett resigned as home secretary on 15 December 2004, amidst allegations that he helped fast-track the renewal of a work permit for his ex-lover's nanny.

Blunkett thanked the Jewish community in 2005 for its "extraordinary support" when "things got difficult" in his personal and professional life, and said that "I won't let you down. I feel deeply honoured when friends from the Jewish community are prepared to welcome me. I feel like one of the family." While he was born a Methodist, his son with Kimberly Quinn attended a Jewish nursery, as Quinn has Jewish heritage. In 2005, he was presented with an honorary doctorate by Haifa University. He is a member of Labour Friends of Israel.

The accusations made against him in November 2004 formed part of an acrimonious public conflict playing out in the Family Court in respect of contested Contact and Responsibility Orders. Clarity about the circumstances and events leading up to and surrounding his departure emerged in the phone hacking trial of 2013/14. On 24 June 2014, Andy Coulson, the former editor of the News of the World and head of communications for David Cameron, was found guilty of a charge of conspiracy to intercept voicemails. Blunkett's detailed evidence was instrumental in the conviction of Andy Coulson, arising from the interview he undertook with Blunkett in August 2004, prior to the News of the World front-page story about his private life.

One aspect of criminal justice changes which Blunkett later indicated he regretted most was introducing imprisonment for public protection in the Criminal Justice Act 2003. This particular sentence had resulted in individuals with repeat, but often minor, offences unable to gain release through the Parole Board, resulting in imprisonment for far longer than had ever been anticipated. In 2012, the European Court of Human Rights declared them unlawful for new offenders, but not retrospectively, leaving nearly 3,000 prisoners on the regime. Blunkett was instrumental, with others across parliament, in bringing about substantial change in the Victims and Prisoners Act 2024, which saw 1800 IPP prisoners on licence released from those conditions in November 2024.

=== Brief return to the cabinet ===
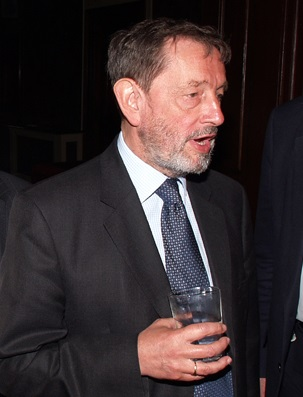
Blunkett in 2009

Following the 2005 general election, Blunkett was returned to the cabinet as secretary of state for work and pensions, where he faced a growing pensions crisis. Two weeks before the election, Blunkett took up a directorship in a company called DNA Bioscience and bought £15,000 of shares in the company. After sustained questions over a six-month period, Blunkett was asked on 31 October 2005 to explain why he had not consulted the Advisory Committee on Business Appointments regarding the directorship. Having placed the shares into an independent trust, he said that the trustees had agreed to dispose of the shares.

Blunkett's political opponents claimed that a conflict of interest was created by him having been director of and holding shares in a company proposing to bid for government contracts to provide paternity tests to the Child Support Agency (CSA), part of the Department for Work and Pensions (DWP), of which he was secretary of state. On 2 November, a scheduled appearance before a House of Commons Select Committee was cancelled at the last minute, and Blunkett was summoned to a meeting at 10 Downing Street. Later that morning, a spokesman for Prime Minister Tony Blair confirmed Blunkett had resigned at the meeting, stating that his position had become untenable. This became the main focus of discussion at the session of Prime Minister's Questions that afternoon, and Conservative leader Michael Howard described the event as 'the beginning of the final chapter of (Blair's) administration'.

Blunkett was later found not to have broken the ministerial code. On 25 November 2005, after he had resigned, Gus O'Donnell wrote to Blunkett confirming that there was no conflict of interest, no failure to declare either Blunkett's shareholding or brief business connection with the company. O'Donnell wrote: "The issue of shareholdings and trusts and the handling of private interests more generally is of course covered quite extensively in Section 5 of the Ministerial Code. There is no ban on a Minister, or his or her immediate family members, holding such interests but where they do the Minister must ensure that no conflict arises, or appears to arise, between his or her public duties and such private interests. In terms of the handling of your interests, and those of your family, you followed correct procedure in notifying your Permanent Secretary of your interests. Neither the DWP nor the CSA were in any contractual relationship with DNA Bioscience, and the CSA's contract for biometric testing was not due to be renewed for some years."

O'Donnell also confirmed that the Advisory Committee on Ministerial Appointments, which had been the bone of contention up to the beginning of November 2005, was in fact voluntary. The code was changed in 2007 to make clear that references prior to taking business appointments shortly after leaving government was to be mandatory as part of the ministerial code.

=== Interests outside parliament ===
Blunkett is a vice president of the Royal National Institute of Blind People and a vice president of the Alzheimer's Society, and has close links with a range of other charities (local to Sheffield and nationally) including those relating to breast cancer, and is a patron of the Employers Network for Equality and Inclusion (enei). He is also a patron of The Micro and Anophthalmic Children's Society, a charity for children born without eyes or with underdeveloped eyes. He is additionally a former honorary chair of the Information Systems Security Association (ISSA-UK) Advisory Board and was, until March 2015, chairman of the not-for-profit International Cyber Security Protection Alliance (ICSPA).

In October 2010, Blunkett proposed the creation of a Yorkshire Parliament, giving autonomy to the historic county with a similar funding formula to the Welsh Assembly's devolved budget, which would entitle Yorkshire to an annual budget of around £24 billion.

One of his main interests is volunteering and community service. In 2011, he published a pamphlet calling for a National Volunteer Programme, which received a wide range of support, particularly among third sector organisations. Since then, Blunkett has commenced putting together and becoming a founder of the Future For Youth Foundation, which sought to tackle high levels of unemployment in young people, and which concluded its work in the summer of 2015.

He was a key voice in the successful NOtoAV campaign in 2010–11, prior to the 2011 Alternative Vote referendum, and in 2011 spoke out against the Coalition Government's proposed boundary changes.

In 2012, he published In Defence of Politics Revisited, in which he set out a range of proposals to increase faith in, and improve the working of, democratic politics. He was later awarded status as an Academician of the Academy of Social Sciences. In 2013, Sheffield University announced Blunkett had become a visiting professor in the Department of Politics, in the world's first Centre for the Public Understanding of Politics.

He was, from 2012 to 2018, a trustee of the government-sponsored, major volunteer programme known as the National Citizen Service Trust, a voluntary community service programme for 16- and 17-year-olds. From 2013 to 2014, he chaired a parliamentary inquiry with the Charities Aid Foundation into how giving to charities could be boosted. This reported in June 2014, making recommendations ranging from the inclusion of a 'social action' section on UCAS forms to the creation of a post-careers advice service, for those who are retiring but wish to continue giving in their community. This led to the National Citizen Service Act coming into law in 2017.

Between June 2013 and May 2014, Blunkett led a review into local oversight of schools and the raising of standards for the leader Ed Miliband and the shadow education secretary. The Blunkett Report was published in May 2014, and called for the creation of new independent Directors of School Standards to operate between local authorities. These directors would focus on bringing greater coherence to the process of school creation, raising standards and improving local accountability.

In June 2014, Blunkett announced he would not be contesting the election in the following year, stating that he had realised he would not be returning to the frontbenches. In his letter he wrote: "it is clear that the leadership of the Party wish to see new faces in Ministerial office and a clear break with the past". The editor of the conservative The Spectator magazine, Fraser Nelson, commented: "He was never under-briefed, and never showed any sign of his disability ... he was one of Labour's very best MPs – and one of the very few people in parliament whose life I would describe as inspirational." Responding to a question from Blunkett on 11 March 2015, Prime Minister David Cameron said: "As a new backbencher, I will never forget coming to this place in 2001 and, in the light of the appalling terrorist attacks that had taken place across the world, seeing the strong leadership he gave on the importance of keeping our country safe. He is a remarkable politician, a remarkable man."

On the 17 July 2026 at the Labour Party's special conference called to confirm the new, incoming Leader of the Labour Party, Andy Burnham, in his acceptance speech, said:

“I was his parliamentary private secretary in my first experience of the front bench, but he has been the truest mentor to me in the decades since, and it’s just wonderful to be with you, Lord Blunkett, David, on this special day. I would say he taught me everything I know, but no… and certainly not about football. But it is wonderful to have you [in] this moment with me, David.”

== Later career ==
In 2013, Blunkett joined the advisory board of global wealth consultancy Oracle Capital Group, continuing in that role until 2017.

Blunkett became chair of the David Ross Education Trust, one of Britain's largest Multi-academy trusts, sponsored by Carphone Warehouse founder David Ross, in 2015. He resigned in 2017, along with several others members of the board, when the sponsor would not acknowledge or take action on major issues raised about governance procedures, and the blocking of an independent review initiated by Blunkett and the then Chief Executive Wendy Marshall.

Blunkett was appointed as Professor of Politics in Practice at the University of Sheffield in June 2015. He was subsequently made Emeritus Professor of the University in April 2026. In 2017, he received an Honorary Doctorate for services to government and education from the University of Huddersfield.

In 2021–2022, Blunkett was tasked by Sir Keir Starmer to lead a Council of Skills Advisors to produce a major report on skills, which was published in October 2022 and entitled: Learning and Skills for Economic Recovery, Social Cohesion and a More Equal Britain. This helped form the basis of the incoming Starmer government's skills agenda, including the establishment of Skills England.

From October 2025 to July 2026, Blunkett co-chaired, with Nick Herbert, Baron Herbert of South Downs (former Conservative policing minister and chair of the College of Policing), the Police Leadership Commission, which undertook a nine-month investigation concluding with the publication of its report, Professionalism and performance – police leadership for the future, on 6 July 2026.

In 2026, Blunkett was a member of the special House of Lords Retirement and Participation committee, which sat between January and July 2026 and published its report on 15 July 2026.

== Writing, speaking, and television appearances ==
In 2001, Blunkett published Politics and Progress: Renewing Democracy and Civil Society. In October 2006, Blunkett's audio diaries were published in his book The Blunkett Tapes: My Life in the Bear Pit. The tapes detail his time as a cabinet minister up to that time, and provide insights into the workings of the Labour cabinet. They were recorded every week, and contain his view of what was happening in Cabinet at the time, alongside contemporary reflections and more recent thoughts on the events. He also published a light-hearted dog-oriented memoir called On a Clear Day, published by Michael O'Mara Books in 1995.

Blunkett has also co-authored a number of publications, including Building from the Bottom (1982), published by the Fabian Society, and Democracy in Crisis (1987), published by Hogarth, which described the battle between local and central government in the Thatcher years. He has also contributed chapters to many books relating to politics and social policy and has also produced research papers with the University of Sheffield. Other publications include Ladders Out of Poverty in 2006 and Mutual Action, Common Purpose in 2009 (relating to the voluntary sector).

Blunkett has contributed a chapter to the 2025 publication, Making Equal: New Visions for Opportunity and Growth, edited by Graeme Atherton and Peter John.

Outside politics, Blunkett enjoys a career as a popular conference and after-dinner speaker. His booking agency JLA states that his speech topics include "The Political Landscape, Overcoming Adversity, Social Responsibility and Diversity." Blunkett has also given lectures and contributed to debates at the Institute of Art and Ideas.

Blunkett has made many radio and television appearances. He took part in a celebrity version of Mastermind, where his specialist subject was Harry Potter. He finished last, scoring 11 points. He was featured on the Channel Five documentary series Banged Up in 2008. Blunkett also appeared as a celebrity chef, competing against Gordon Ramsay, on season 4 episode 4 of the British television series The F Word. In 2018, Blunkett featured on the University Challenge Christmas editions, representing Sheffield.

== Personal life ==
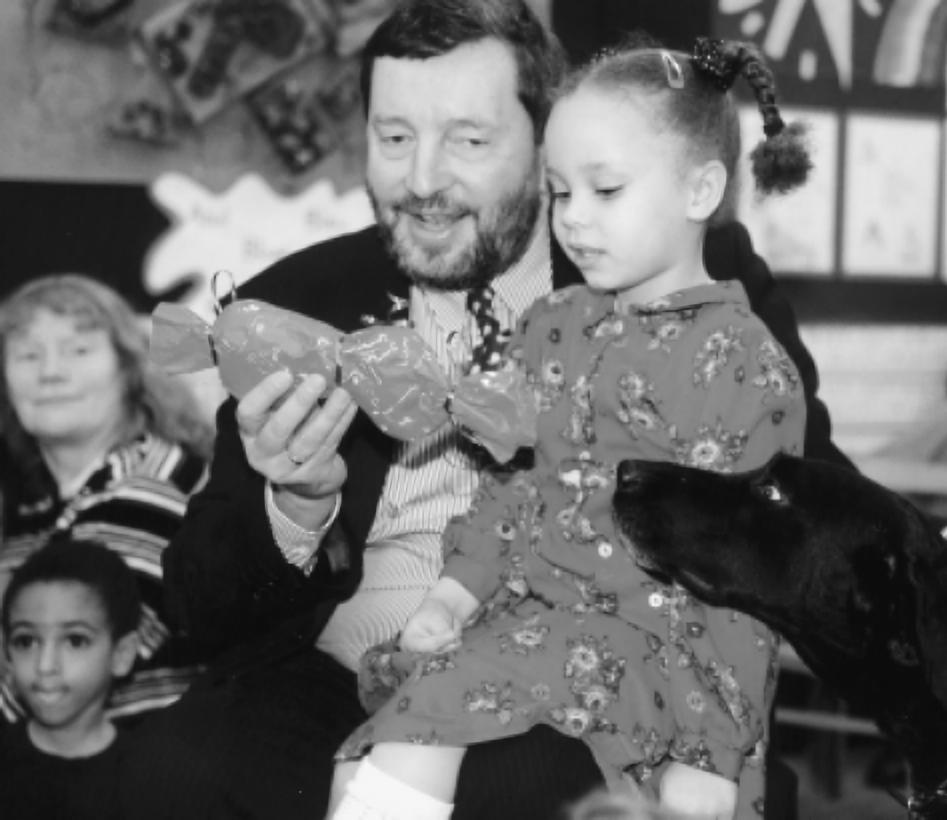
Blunkett's guide dog Lucy receiving a gift at a nursery school, 1999

Blunkett divorced his wife of 20 years, Ruth Mitchell, with whom he had three sons, in 1990. In 2004, the News of the World revealed a three-year affair with Kimberly Quinn, a married former publisher of The Spectator, and the disputed parentage of their then two-year-old child. After prolonged press speculation, DNA tests showed that Blunkett was the father. In 2005, The People newspaper launched a cycle of media speculation about Blunkett's alleged relationship with a young woman. The newspaper later apologised, admitting that the story was entirely false.

In January 2009, Blunkett announced that he was engaged to be married to Margaret Williams, a doctor in Sheffield. They married the same year.

Blunkett's guide dogs – Ruby, Teddy, Offa, Lucy, Sadie, Cosby, and Barley – became familiar characters in the House of Commons and House of Lords, usually sleeping at his feet on the floor of the chambers, inspiring occasional comments from Blunkett and his fellow MPs on both sides of the house. In one incident, Lucy (a cross between a black Labrador and a curly coat retriever) vomited during a speech by Conservative member David Willetts. On another occasion, his new guide dog led him to the Conservative Party benches.

On 25 July 2024, while on holiday in Italy, Blunkett suffered a heart attack. He was rushed to hospital and had stents implanted. He was subject to further substantial treatment on his return to Sheffield.

== In popular culture ==
Blunkett was portrayed by Phil Cornwell in The Comic Strip Presents' 1992 film Red Nose of Courage. He was also portrayed in series 3 episode 1 ("Deadlier than the Male") of the ITV series Ultimate Force. Blunkett was introduced in the final scene as "The Home Secretary" with a shot of his feet and guide dog arriving to congratulate red troop on a successful operation. He was also parodied in the TV comedy Believe Nothing.

He was regularly caricatured on the popular animated satire series, 2DTV, where he was portrayed by Dave Lamb. The show often made jokes about his crime polices and his affair scandals, often teamed with jokes referring to his blindness. He was also portrayed as an amalgam of himself and Krusty the Clown from The Simpsons as Blunksy the Clown, with wide open eyes with pupils that would constantly dart around in all directions.

Satirist Alistair Beaton wrote the television film A Very Social Secretary for Channel 4, which was broadcast in October 2005. Blunkett was played by Bernard Hill. Blunkett appears regularly both on news and magazine programmes, and he was the subject of an episode of The House I Grew Up In.

== Bibliography ==
- Building from the Bottom (1982), published by the Fabian Society
- Blunkett, David; Jackson, Keith (1987). Democracy in Crisis: The Town Halls Respond. Hogarth Press. ISBN 978-0-7012-0777-9.
- Blunkett, David (2001). Politics and Progress: Renewing Democracy and a Civil Society. Demos. ISBN 978-1-84275-024-7.
- Blunkett, David; MacCormick, Alex (2002). On a Clear Day (revised ed.). Michael O'Mara Books. ISBN 978-1-84317-007-5.
- Blunkett, David (16 October 2006). The Blunkett Tapes: My life in the bear pit. Bloomsbury. ISBN 978-0-7475-8823-8.
- Minogue, Kenneth (2002). Civil Society and David Blunkett: Lawyers Vs. Politicians. Civitas. ISBN 978-1-903386-22-4.
- Pollard, Stephen (14 December 2004). David Blunkett. Hodder & Stoughton. ISBN 978-0-340-82534-1.

Political offices
Preceded by George Wilson	Leader of Sheffield City Council; 1980–1987	Succeeded by Clive Betts
Preceded by Gillian Shephard	Secretary of State for Education and Employment; 1997–2001	Succeeded by Estelle Morris as Secretary of State for Education and Skills
Preceded by Gillian Shephard	Secretary of State for Education and Employment; 1997–2001	Succeeded by Alistair Darling as Secretary of State for Work and Pensions
Preceded by Jack Straw	Home Secretary; 2001–2004	Succeeded by Charles Clarke
Preceded by Alan Johnson	Secretary of State for Work and Pensions; 2005	Succeeded by John Hutton
Parliament of the United Kingdom
Preceded by Joan Maynard	Member of Parliament for Sheffield Brightside; 1987–2010	Succeeded by Himself as Member for Sheffield Brightside and Hillsborough
Preceded by Himself as Member for Sheffield Brightside	Member of Parliament for Sheffield Brightside and Hillsborough; 2010–2015	Succeeded by Harry Harpham
Party political offices
Preceded by Tony Clarke	Chair of the Labour Party; 1993–1994	Succeeded by Gordon Colling
Orders of precedence in the United Kingdom
Preceded by The Lord Keen of Elie	Baron of the United Kingdom	Succeeded by The Lord Hayward
