= 2023 Sheffield City Council election =

Local election in England

- 4 May 2023

28 of 84 seats on Sheffield City Council 43 seats needed for a majority

| | First party | Second party | Third party |
|---|---|---|---|
| Leader | Terry Fox | Shaffaq Mohammed | Douglas Johnson |
| Party | Labour | Liberal Democrats | Green |
| Seats before | 39 | 29 | 14 |
| Seats won | 14 | 11 | 4 |
| Seats after | 39 | 29 | 14 |
| Seat change | Steady | Steady | Steady |
| Popular vote | 49,606 | 32,764 | 24,339 |
| Percentage | 39.6% | 26.2% | 19.4% |
| Swing | ▼1.0% | ▲4.4% | ▼1.8% |
| | Fourth party | Fifth party |
| Leader | Lewis Chinchen |
| Party | Conservative | Independent |
| Seats before | 1 | 1 |
| Seats won | 0 | 0 |
| Seats after | 1 | 1 |
| Seat change | Steady | Steady |
| Popular vote | 13,539 | 325 |
| Percentage | 10.8% | 0.3% |
| Swing | ▼2.3% |
- Winner of each seat at the 2023 Sheffield City Council election
Leader before election
Terry Fox
Labour
No overall control
Leader after election
Tom Hunt
Labour
No overall control

The 2023 Sheffield City Council election took place on 4 May 2023 to elect members of Sheffield City Council in England. There were 29 of the 84 seats on the council up for election, being the usual third of the seats plus a by-election in Manor Castle ward. The election took place at the same time as other local elections across England.

The council was under no overall control prior to the election, with Labour councillor Terry Fox serving as leader of the council. The council remained under no overall control after the election and Terry Fox resigned as leader on 5 May 2023. Labour councillor Tom Hunt was appointed leader of the council at the subsequent annual council meeting.

== Electoral process ==
The council elects its councillors in thirds, with a third being up for election every year for three years, with no election in the fourth year. Councillors are elected via first-past-the-post voting, with each ward represented by three councillors, with one elected in each election year to serve a four-year term.

All registered electors (British, Irish, Commonwealth and European Union citizens) living in Sheffield aged 18 or over are entitled to vote in the election. People who live at two addresses in different councils, such as university students with different term-time and holiday addresses, are entitled to be registered for and vote in elections in both local authorities. Voting in person at polling stations took place from 07:00 to 22:00 on election day, and voters were able to apply for postal votes or proxy votes in advance of the election.

== Results summary ==
2023 Sheffield City Council election
| Party | Seats | Gains | Losses | Net gain/loss | Seats % | Votes % | Votes | +/− |
|---|---|---|---|---|---|---|---|---|
| Labour | 14 | 1 | 1 | Steady | 48.3 | 39.6 | 49,606 | -1.0 |
| Liberal Democrats | 11 | 0 | 0 | Steady | 37.9 | 26.2 | 32,764 | +4.4 |
| Green | 4 | 1 | 1 | Steady | 13.8 | 19.4 | 24,339 | -1.8 |
| Conservative | 0 | 0 | 0 | Steady | 0.0 | 10.8 | 13,539 | -2.3 |
| TUSC | 0 | 0 | 0 | Steady | 0.0 | 2.3 | 2,852 | +1.3 |
| Reform | 0 | 0 | 0 | Steady | 0.0 | 0.8 | 996 | +0.5 |
| Yorkshire | 0 | 0 | 0 | Steady | 0.0 | 0.4 | 479 | -0.5 |
| Independent | 0 | 0 | 0 | Steady | 0.0 | 0.3 | 325 | -0.1 |
| SDP | 0 | 0 | 0 | Steady | 0.0 | 0.1 | 183 | -0.1 |
| Communist | 0 | 0 | 0 | Steady | 0.0 | 0.1 | 66 | ±0.0 |

A Labour seat in Manor Castle ward had become vacant after the death of Anne Murphy.

| Party | Previous council | New council | +/- |
|---|---|---|---|
| Labour | 38 | 39 | ▲1 |
| Liberal Democrats | 29 | 29 | - |
| Green | 14 | 14 | - |
| Conservative | 1 | 1 | - |
| Independent | 1 | 1 | - |
| Vacant | 1 | 0 | ▼1 |
| Total | 84 | 84 | |
| Working majority | -8 | -6 | |

== Ward results ==
Asterisks (*) denote incumbent councillors seeking re-election.

=== Beauchief & Greenhill ===
Beauchief & Greenhill
| Party | Candidate | Votes | % | ±% |
|---|---|---|---|---|
| Liberal Democrats | Richard Shaw* | 2,207 | 46.0 | +5.9 |
| Labour Co-op | Mary Bishop | 1,505 | 31.4 | −5.0 |
| Green | Gill Black | 454 | 9.5 | −2.1 |
| Conservative | Scott Darby | 379 | 7.9 | −4.0 |
| Reform | Pete Reilly | 180 | 3.8 | N/A |
| TUSC | Leah Byatt | 68 | 1.4 | N/A |
| Majority | | 702 | | |
| Turnout | | 4,793 | 34.81 | −0.64 |
| Liberal Democrats hold | | Swing | | |

=== Beighton ===
Beighton
| Party | Candidate | Votes | % | ±% |
|---|---|---|---|---|
| Liberal Democrats | Ian Horner | 1,879 | 49.4 | +10.2 |
| Labour | Michael Chilton | 1,298 | 34.1 | −3.0 |
| Conservative | Salieu Favour Bah | 367 | 9.6 | −6.6 |
| Green | Stewart Kemp | 162 | 4.3 | −3.1 |
| TUSC | Mark Dixey | 99 | 2.6 | N/A |
| Majority | | 581 | | |
| Turnout | | 3,805 | 28.94 | −1.55 |
| Liberal Democrats hold | | Swing | | |

=== Birley ===
Birley
| Party | Candidate | Votes | % | ±% |
|---|---|---|---|---|
| Labour | Denise Fox* | 1,594 | 52.7 | −3.7 |
| Conservative | Steven Winstone | 573 | 18.9 | −0.2 |
| Green | Alan Yearsley | 344 | 11.4 | +2.0 |
| Liberal Democrats | James Ellwood | 277 | 9.2 | +3.8 |
| Independent | Anne Barr | 189 | 6.2 | N/A |
| TUSC | Simon Moulton | 49 | 1.6 | N/A |
| Majority | | 1,021 | | |
| Turnout | | 3,026 | 24.30 | −0.95 |
| Labour hold | | Swing | | |

=== Broomhill & Sharrow Vale ===
Broomhill & Sharrow Vale
| Party | Candidate | Votes | % | ±% |
|---|---|---|---|---|
| Green | Angela Argenzio* | 2,601 | 51.7 | +4.8 |
| Labour Co-op | Lewis Dagnall | 1,705 | 33.9 | −6.0 |
| Liberal Democrats | Patrick Gilbert | 326 | 6.5 | +1.3 |
| Conservative | Gordon Millward | 257 | 5.1 | ±0.0 |
| TUSC | Noah Eden | 139 | 2.8 | −0.1 |
| Majority | | 896 | | |
| Turnout | | 5,028 | 31.57 | −1.33 |
| Green hold | | Swing | | |

=== Burngreave ===
Burngreave
| Party | Candidate | Votes | % | ±% |
|---|---|---|---|---|
| Labour | Talib Hussain* | 2,299 | 67.0 | −4.0 |
| Green | Mustafa Ahmed | 437 | 12.7 | −3.7 |
| Liberal Democrats | Jordan Barry | 314 | 9.1 | +3.7 |
| Conservative | Oluwaseun Ajao | 234 | 6.8 | −0.4 |
| TUSC | Simon Jenkins | 79 | 2.3 | N/A |
| Reform | Khalil Al-Asad | 70 | 2.0 | N/A |
| Majority | | 1,862 | | |
| Turnout | | 3,433 | 23.66 | −3.32 |
| Labour hold | | Swing | | |

=== City ===
City
| Party | Candidate | Votes | % | ±% |
|---|---|---|---|---|
| Green | Ruth Mersereau* | 1,119 | 53.4 | −2.0 |
| Labour | Gareth Slater | 626 | 29.9 | −1.7 |
| Liberal Democrats | Julia Wright | 110 | 5.3 | +1.3 |
| Conservative | Matthew Chapman | 102 | 4.9 | −0.3 |
| TUSC | Alexander Helie | 93 | 4.4 | N/A |
| Yorkshire | Gareth Shanks | 45 | 2.1 | N/A |
| Majority | | 493 | | |
| Turnout | | 2,095 | 15.96 | −0.19 |
| Green hold | | Swing | | |

=== Crookes & Crosspool ===
Crookes & Crosspool
| Party | Candidate | Votes | % | ±% |
|---|---|---|---|---|
| Liberal Democrats | Tim Huggan* | 2,734 | 41.2 | +6.7 |
| Labour Co-op | John Wright | 2,547 | 38.4 | +0.9 |
| Green | Oscar Idle | 908 | 13.7 | −4.2 |
| Conservative | Roger Barnsley | 333 | 5.0 | −2.0 |
| TUSC | Joseph Hibbert | 113 | 1.7 | +0.6 |
| Majority | | 187 | | |
| Turnout | | 6,635 | 45.57 | +0.81 |
| Liberal Democrats hold | | Swing | | |

=== Darnall ===
Darnall
| Party | Candidate | Votes | % | ±% |
|---|---|---|---|---|
| Labour | Mary Lea* | 2,188 | 68.1 | +1.8 |
| Liberal Democrats | Adil Mohammed | 441 | 13.7 | +1.6 |
| Conservative | Theresa Morrison | 315 | 9.8 | −1.9 |
| Green | Eamonn Ward | 173 | 5.4 | −0.6 |
| TUSC | Diane Spencer | 94 | 2.9 | −1.0 |
| Majority | | 1,747 | | |
| Turnout | | 3,211 | 23.94 | −2.68 |
| Labour hold | | Swing | | |

=== Dore & Totley ===
Dore & Totley
| Party | Candidate | Votes | % | ±% |
|---|---|---|---|---|
| Liberal Democrats | Joe Otten* | 3,744 | 56.1 | +5.7 |
| Labour | Dominic Ridler | 1,159 | 17.4 | +0.8 |
| Conservative | Joanne Lowe | 963 | 14.4 | −5.3 |
| Green | Bex Whyman | 759 | 11.4 | −1.9 |
| TUSC | Bridget Gilbert | 53 | 0.8 | N/A |
| Majority | | 2,585 | | |
| Turnout | | 6,678 | 45.62 | +0.63 |
| Liberal Democrats hold | | Swing | | |

=== East Ecclesfield ===
East Ecclesfield
| Party | Candidate | Votes | % | ±% |
|---|---|---|---|---|
| Liberal Democrats | Rob Reiss | 1,741 | 41.1 | +7.1 |
| Labour Co-op | Bridget Kelly | 1,633 | 38.5 | −3.6 |
| Conservative | Oliver O'Brien | 500 | 11.8 | −7.0 |
| Green | Rosie Trevillion | 263 | 6.2 | +1.1 |
| TUSC | Harry Lomas | 102 | 2.4 | N/A |
| Majority | | 108 | | |
| Turnout | | 4,239 | 30.88 | −1.53 |
| Liberal Democrats hold | | Swing | | |

=== Ecclesall ===
Ecclesall
| Party | Candidate | Votes | % | ±% |
|---|---|---|---|---|
| Liberal Democrats | Barbara Masters* | 3,400 | 40.7 | +7.8 |
| Green | Peter Gilbert | 2,680 | 32.1 | +3.8 |
| Labour | Lisa Markham | 1,676 | 20.1 | −7.8 |
| Conservative | Elizabeth Finney | 502 | 6.0 | −3.3 |
| TUSC | Jemima Johnson | 101 | 1.2 | N/A |
| Majority | | 720 | | |
| Turnout | | 8,359 | 53.08 | +2.04 |
| Liberal Democrats hold | | Swing | | |

=== Firth Park ===
Firth Park
| Party | Candidate | Votes | % | ±% |
|---|---|---|---|---|
| Labour | Abdul Khayum* | 1,571 | 56.2 | +2.0 |
| Green | Joydu Al-Mahfuz | 439 | 15.7 | +9.3 |
| Conservative | Sara Chinchen | 320 | 11.4 | −3.3 |
| Liberal Democrats | Shelley Cockayne | 199 | 7.1 | −7.1 |
| SDP | April Worrall | 183 | 6.5 | −0.9 |
| TUSC | Joanna Hall | 84 | 3.0 | ±0.0 |
| Majority | | 1,032 | | |
| Turnout | | 2,796 | 19.70 | −2.14 |
| Labour hold | | Swing | | |

=== Fulwood ===
Fulwood
| Party | Candidate | Votes | % | ±% |
|---|---|---|---|---|
| Liberal Democrats | Andrew Sangar* | 3,427 | 52.2 | +10.5 |
| Labour | Matthew Killeya | 1,810 | 27.6 | −2.7 |
| Green | Dylan Lewis-Creser | 752 | 11.5 | −5.7 |
| Conservative | Christine Saunders | 500 | 7.6 | −3.1 |
| TUSC | John Bunn | 78 | 1.2 | N/A |
| Majority | | 1,617 | 24.6 | |
| Turnout | | 6,567 | 46.29 | +0.19 |
| Liberal Democrats hold | | Swing | | |

=== Gleadless Valley ===
Gleadless Valley
| Party | Candidate | Votes | % | ±% |
|---|---|---|---|---|
| Green | Paul Turpin* | 2,094 | 45.5 | −1.9 |
| Labour | Mia Drazaic | 1,729 | 37.6 | +0.5 |
| Conservative | Shirley Clayton | 324 | 7.0 | −1.3 |
| Liberal Democrats | John Dryden | 284 | 6.2 | +1.0 |
| TUSC | Daniel Smith | 172 | 3.7 | +1.8 |
| Majority | | 365 | | |
| Turnout | | 4,603 | 34.43 | −2.21 |
| Green hold | | Swing | | |

=== Graves Park ===
Graves Park
| Party | Candidate | Votes | % | ±% |
|---|---|---|---|---|
| Liberal Democrats | Mohammed Mahroof | 2,228 | 40.1 | +3.8 |
| Labour | Amy Frances Mount | 1,981 | 35.7 | +1.0 |
| Green | Thomas Atkin | 800 | 14.4 | −6.5 |
| Conservative | Christopher Garratt | 432 | 7.8 | −0.3 |
| TUSC | Liam Ball | 113 | 2.0 | N/A |
| Majority | | 247 | | |
| Turnout | | 5,554 | 41.89 | +0.40 |
| Liberal Democrats hold | | Swing | | |

=== Hillsborough ===
Hillsborough
| Party | Candidate | Votes | % | ±% |
|---|---|---|---|---|
| Green | Toby Mallinson | 2,434 | 46.1 | +1.0 |
| Labour Co-op | George Lindars-Hammond* | 2,032 | 38.5 | −0.1 |
| Conservative | Patricia Barnsley | 447 | 8.5 | −1.6 |
| Liberal Democrats | Will Sapwell | 263 | 5.0 | +0.7 |
| TUSC | Rory Smith | 106 | 2.0 | +0.1 |
| Majority | | 402 | | |
| Turnout | | 5,282 | 36.36 | +0.05 |
| Green gain from Labour | | Swing | | |

=== Manor Castle ===
Two seats were up for election in Manor Castle due to the death of councillor Anne Murphy.

Manor Castle
| Party | Candidate | Votes | % | ±% |
|---|---|---|---|---|
| Labour Co-op | Laura Moynahan | 1,508 | 49.5 | −3.0 |
| Labour Co-op | Sioned-Mair Richards* | 1,274 | 41.8 | −10.7 |
| Green | Ruth Flagg-Abbey | 654 | 21.5 | +3.6 |
| Green | Catherine Fish | 584 | 19.2 | +1.3 |
| Yorkshire | Jack Carrington | 434 | 14.2 | +4.3 |
| Conservative | Isaac Howarth | 309 | 10.1 | −1.9 |
| Liberal Democrats | Zoe Boston | 249 | 8.2 | +3.4 |
| Liberal Democrats | Stephanie Kenning | 206 | 6.8 | +2.0 |
| TUSC | Alistair Tice | 171 | 5.6 | +2.5 |
| Independent | Justin Buxton | 108 | 3.5 | N/A |
| Independent | Helen McIlroy | 78 | 2.6 | N/A |
| Independent | Dan Kahn | 28 | 0.9 | N/A |
| Majority | | | | |
| Turnout | | 3,046 | 20.79 | −0.55 |
| Labour hold | | Swing | | |
| Labour hold | | Swing | | |

=== Mosborough ===
Mosborough
| Party | Candidate | Votes | % | ±% |
|---|---|---|---|---|
| Liberal Democrats | Glynis Chapman | 1,788 | 43.1 | +2.2 |
| Labour Co-op | Samantha Nicholson | 1,546 | 37.2 | −0.8 |
| Conservative | Mark Finney | 497 | 12.0 | −3.6 |
| Green | Julie White | 215 | 5.2 | −0.3 |
| TUSC | Joseph Howard | 105 | 2.5 | N/A |
| Majority | | 242 | | |
| Turnout | | 4,151 | 30.82 | −0.95 |
| Liberal Democrats hold | | Swing | | |

=== Nether Edge & Sharrow ===
Nether Edge & Sharrow
| Party | Candidate | Votes | % | ±% |
|---|---|---|---|---|
| Labour Co-op | Ibby Ullah | 3,072 | 47.4 | −0.2 |
| Green | Bev Bennett | 2,437 | 37.6 | −2.0 |
| Liberal Democrats | Chris Lynch | 519 | 8.0 | +2.0 |
| Conservative | John Chapman | 277 | 4.3 | −0.1 |
| TUSC | Holly Johnston | 175 | 2.7 | +0.3 |
| Majority | | 635 | | |
| Turnout | | 6,480 | 42.21 | −0.58 |
| Labour gain from Green | | Swing | | |

=== Park & Arbourthorne ===
Park & Arbourthorne
| Party | Candidate | Votes | % | ±% |
|---|---|---|---|---|
| Labour Co-op | Ben Miskell* | 1,546 | 49.9 | +5.1 |
| Conservative | Richard Blyth | 575 | 18.6 | +0.2 |
| Green | Jen Barnard | 526 | 17.0 | −0.4 |
| Liberal Democrats | Ann Kingdom | 304 | 9.8 | +1.5 |
| TUSC | Jack Jeffery | 148 | 4.8 | +1.6 |
| Majority | | 971 | | |
| Turnout | | 3,099 | 23.99 | −1.27 |
| Labour hold | | Swing | | |

=== Richmond ===
Richmond
| Party | Candidate | Votes | % | ±% |
|---|---|---|---|---|
| Labour | Dianne Hurst* | 1,666 | 52.3 | +1.9 |
| Conservative | Andrew Smith | 569 | 17.8 | −3.6 |
| Green | Luke Hunt | 304 | 9.5 | −2.9 |
| Liberal Democrats | Susan Ross | 289 | 9.1 | +3.5 |
| Reform | Brian Kus | 248 | 7.8 | N/A |
| TUSC | Susan Statter | 112 | 3.5 | +2.2 |
| Majority | | 1,097 | | |
| Turnout | | 3,188 | 23.06 | −0.77 |
| Labour hold | | Swing | | |

=== Shiregreen & Brightside ===
Shiregreen & Brightside
| Party | Candidate | Votes | % | ±% |
|---|---|---|---|---|
| Labour Co-op | Dawn Dale* | 1,621 | 60.3 | +1.7 |
| Conservative | Zoe Steane | 514 | 19.1 | +0.1 |
| Green | Joel Gilbert | 300 | 11.2 | +0.1 |
| Liberal Democrats | Diane Leek | 228 | 8.5 | −0.1 |
| Communist | Ben Ughetti | 66 | 2.5 | −0.2 |
| Majority | | 1,107 | | |
| Turnout | | 2,689 | 19.72 | −1.92 |
| Labour hold | | Swing | | |

=== Southey ===
Southey
| Party | Candidate | Votes | % | ±% |
|---|---|---|---|---|
| Labour | Mike Chaplin* | 1,658 | 60.1 | +3.6 |
| Conservative | Lesley Blyth | 449 | 16.3 | −3.6 |
| Green | Andrew Hards | 312 | 11.3 | −4.2 |
| Liberal Democrats | Kevin Grum | 228 | 8.3 | +0.1 |
| TUSC | Luke Brownbill | 114 | 4.1 | N/A |
| Majority | | 1,209 | | |
| Turnout | | 2,761 | 20.10 | −1.02 |
| Labour hold | | Swing | | |

=== Stannington ===
Stannington
| Party | Candidate | Votes | % | ±% |
|---|---|---|---|---|
| Liberal Democrats | Penny Baker* | 2,783 | 52.4 | +15.6 |
| Labour | Seun Ebenezer | 1,247 | 23.5 | −5.1 |
| Conservative | Ben Woollard | 706 | 13.3 | −0.9 |
| Green | Matty Kimber | 498 | 9.4 | −5.2 |
| TUSC | Robert Simpson | 80 | 1.5 | N/A |
| Majority | | 1,536 | | |
| Turnout | | 5,314 | 37.22 | −0.94 |
| Liberal Democrats hold | | Swing | | |

=== Stocksbridge & Upper Don ===
Stocksbridge & Upper Don
| Party | Candidate | Votes | % | ±% |
|---|---|---|---|---|
| Labour | Julie Grocutt* | 2,678 | 51.3 | +12.7 |
| Conservative | David Chinchen | 1,791 | 34.3 | −1.3 |
| Green | David Willington | 390 | 7.5 | −7.0 |
| Liberal Democrats | Amanda Davey | 295 | 5.6 | −5.6 |
| TUSC | Patricia Prystupa | 48 | 0.9 | N/A |
| Majority | | 887 | | |
| Turnout | | 5,223 | 36.10 | +0.79 |
| Labour hold | | Swing | | |

=== Walkley ===
Walkley
| Party | Candidate | Votes | % | ±% |
|---|---|---|---|---|
| Labour | Laura McClean | 2,769 | 50.5 | +6.7 |
| Green | Ash Routh | 1,767 | 32.2 | −9.9 |
| Liberal Democrats | Alex Purvis | 358 | 6.5 | +2.2 |
| Conservative | Evelyn Millward | 271 | 4.9 | −1.8 |
| TUSC | Isabelle France | 162 | 3.0 | +1.5 |
| Reform | John Davidson | 158 | 2.9 | N/A |
| Majority | | 1,002 | 18.27 | |
| Turnout | | 5,485 | 36.35 | −0.74 |
| Labour hold | | Swing | | |

=== West Ecclesfield ===
West Ecclesfield
| Party | Candidate | Votes | % | ±% |
|---|---|---|---|---|
| Liberal Democrats | Alan Hooper* | 1,856 | 45.2 | +6.5 |
| Labour | Adam Hurst | 1,236 | 30.1 | −1.1 |
| Conservative | Kevin Mahoney | 390 | 9.5 | −5.3 |
| Reform | John Booker | 340 | 8.3 | −0.1 |
| Green | Kathy Aston | 227 | 5.5 | −1.4 |
| TUSC | Rebecca Fryer | 54 | 1.3 | N/A |
| Majority | | 620 | | |
| Turnout | | 4,103 | 30.82 | −1.09 |
| Liberal Democrats hold | | Swing | | |

=== Woodhouse ===
Woodhouse
| Party | Candidate | Votes | % | ±% |
|---|---|---|---|---|
| Labour Co-op | Alison Norris | 1,706 | 55.5 | +1.4 |
| Conservative | Anne Smith | 643 | 20.9 | +1.7 |
| Liberal Democrats | Charles Edwardson | 293 | 9.5 | +3.1 |
| Green | Chris Bragg | 290 | 9.4 | +1.2 |
| TUSC | Joshua Crapper | 140 | 4.6 | +2.4 |
| Majority | | 1,063 | | |
| Turnout | | 3,072 | 24.17 | −0.84 |
| Labour hold | | Swing | | |

== By-elections ==
=== Stannington ===
By-election due to the death of councillor Vickie Priestley.

Stannington: 18 January 2024
| Party | Candidate | Votes | % | ±% |
|---|---|---|---|---|
| Liberal Democrats | Will Sapwell | 2,258 | 52.7 | +0.3 |
| Labour | Lewis Dagnall | 1,212 | 28.3 | +4.8 |
| Conservative | Ben Woollard | 372 | 8.7 | −4.6 |
| Green | Chris Bragg | 328 | 7.6 | −1.8 |
| Liberal | Rod Rodgers | 118 | 2.8 | N/A |
| Majority | | 1,046 | 24.4 | |
| Turnout | | 4,288 | 30.27 | −6.95 |
| Liberal Democrats hold | | Swing | | |
