= Southey Green =

Southey Green may refer to:

- Southey, South Yorkshire, England, including the suburb of Southey Green
- Southey Green, Essex, hamlet in Essex, England
