= Gill Furniss =

British Labour politician (born 1957)

Gill Furniss MP
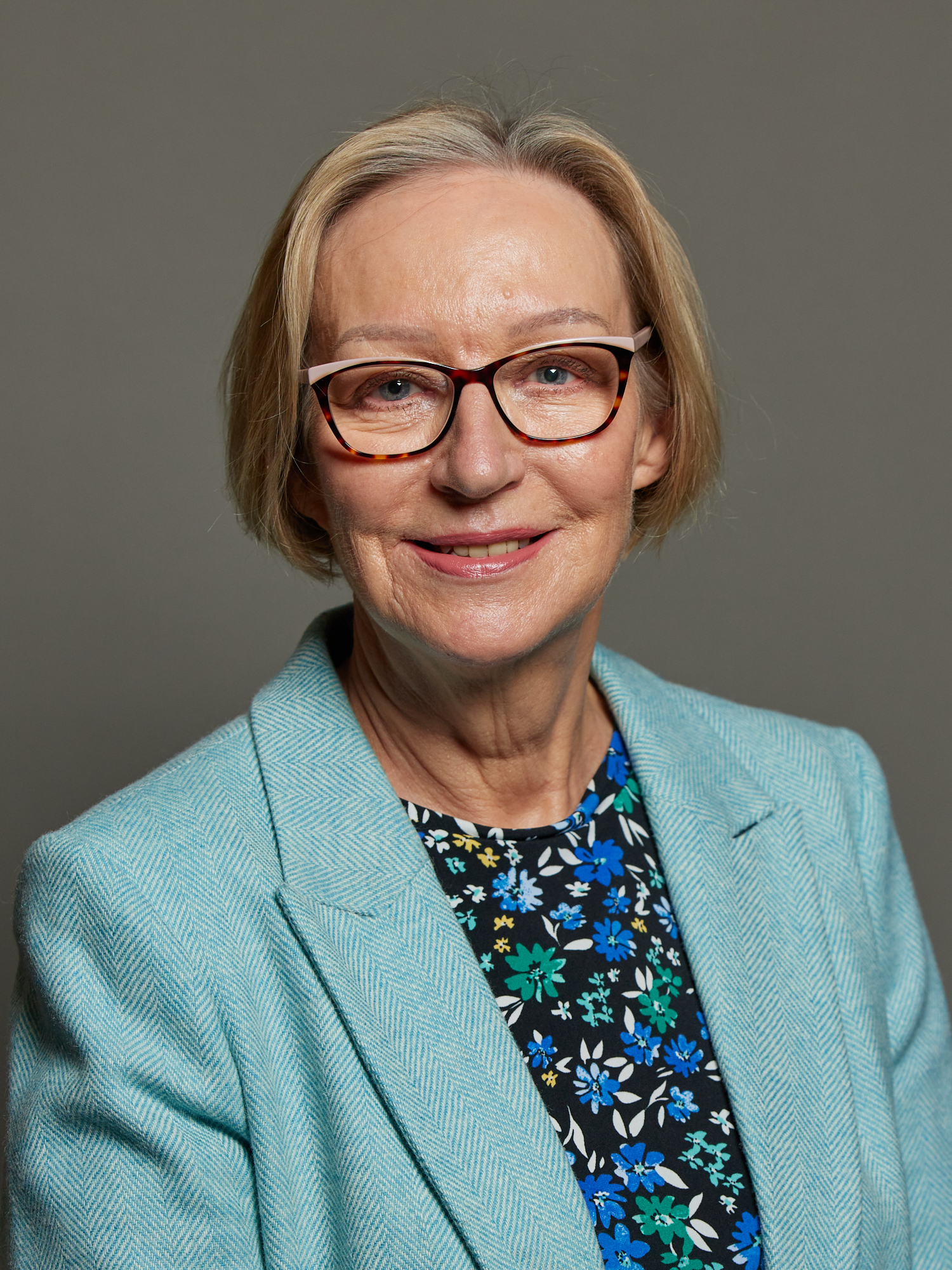
- Official portrait, 2022

Member of Parliament for Sheffield Brightside and Hillsborough
- Incumbent
- Assumed office 5 May 2016
- Preceded by: Harry Harpham
- Majority: 11,600 (36.7%)
Shadow portfolios
2023–2024	Pensions
2022–2023	Roads
2020–2022	Whip
2020–2020	Women and Equalities
2016–2020	Steel, Postal Affairs and Consumer Protection

Member of Sheffield City Council
- In office 6 May 1999 – 5 May 2016
- Ward: Manor (1999–2004); Southey (2004–2016)
- Preceded by: William Jordan
- Succeeded by: Jayne Dunn

Personal details
- Born: 14 March 1957 (age 69) Sheffield, West Riding of Yorkshire, England
- Party: Labour
- Spouse: Harry Harpham (died 2016)
- Education: Leeds Beckett University (BA)
- Website: gillfurniss.com

Gillian Furniss (born 14 March 1957) is a British Labour Party politician who has been the Member of Parliament (MP) for Sheffield Brightside and Hillsborough since 2016. She was a Member of Sheffield City Council from 1999 to 2016.

== Early life and career ==
Gillian Furniss was born in Sheffield on 14 March 1957, the daughter of a steel worker, and was educated at the Chaucer School, Sheffield. After leaving school, she worked as a librarian, and went on to work as an administrator at the Northern General Hospital. In 1998 – as a mature student – she graduated BA in Library and Information Studies, from Leeds Metropolitan University.

== Political career ==
Furniss unsuccessfully stood as the Labour candidate in the Hillsborough Ward in 1998. She was subsequently elected in the Manor ward in 1999 and re-elected in 2003. With the introduction of new ward boundaries for the 2004 Sheffield City Council election, she was elected to represent Southey ward. She was re-elected in 2006, 2010 and 2014 before standing down in 2016 upon her election as an MP.

As a councillor, in 2015 Furniss endorsed Andy Burnham in the Labour leadership contest.

== Parliamentary career ==
Furniss stood as the Labour candidate in Sheffield Hallam at the 2001 general election, coming third with 12.4% of the vote behind the incumbent Liberal Democrat MP Richard Allan and the Conservative candidate.

At the 2016 Sheffield Brightside and Hillsborough by-election, caused by the death of her husband Harry Harpham Furniss was elected to Parliament as MP for Sheffield Brightside and Hillsborough with 62.5% of the vote and a majority of 9,590.

In the October 2016 opposition front bench reshuffle, Furniss was appointed to the new position of Shadow Minister for Steel, Postal Affairs and Consumer Protection.

Furniss was re-elected as MP for Sheffield Brightside and Hillsborough at the snap 2017 general election with an increased vote share of 67.3% and an increased majority of 19,143. She was again re-elected at the 2019 general election, with a decreased vote share of 56.5% and a decreased majority of 12,274.

Following the election of Keir Starmer as Labour leader in April 2020, she became Shadow Minister for Women and Equalities. She moved to become an Opposition Whip in July 2020, and served in the role until her appointment as Shadow Roads Minister in January 2022. Her shadow transport brief covered green transport, transport decarbonisation, future transport and roads.

In the 2023 British shadow cabinet reshuffle, she was appointed Shadow Minister for Pensions.

At the 2024 general election, Furniss was again re-elected with a decreased vote share of 51.6% and a decreased majority of 11,600.

Furniss employs her daughter, Emily Grace Ahmed, as her Executive Office Manager on a salary up to £45,000. This salary is paid out of Furniss' parliamentary expenses. Although MPs who were first elected in 2017 have been banned from employing family members, on the grounds that this promotes nepotism, the restriction is not retrospective—meaning that Furniss' employment of her daughter is lawful.

Parliament of the United Kingdom
Preceded by Harry Harpham	Member of Parliament for Sheffield Brightside and Hillsborough; 2016–present	Incumbent
