= Sheffield Brightside and Hillsborough =

UK Parliament constituency (since 2010)

Coordinates: 53.411°N 1.452°W

- Borough constituency for the House of Commons
- Boundaries since 2024
- Boundary of Sheffield Brightside and Hillsborough in Yorkshire and the Humber
- County: South Yorkshire
- Electorate: 67,888 (December 2019)

Current constituency
- Created: 2010
- Member of Parliament: Gill Furniss (Labour)
- Seats: One
- Created from: Sheffield Hillsborough, Sheffield Brightside

Sheffield Brightside and Hillsborough is a constituency (Note: A borough constituency (for the purposes of election expenses and type of returning officer)) represented in the House of Commons of the UK Parliament since 2016 by Gill Furniss, a member of the Labour Party. (Note: As with all constituencies, the constituency elects one Member of Parliament (MP) by the first-past-the-post system of election at least every five years.)

== Constituency profile ==
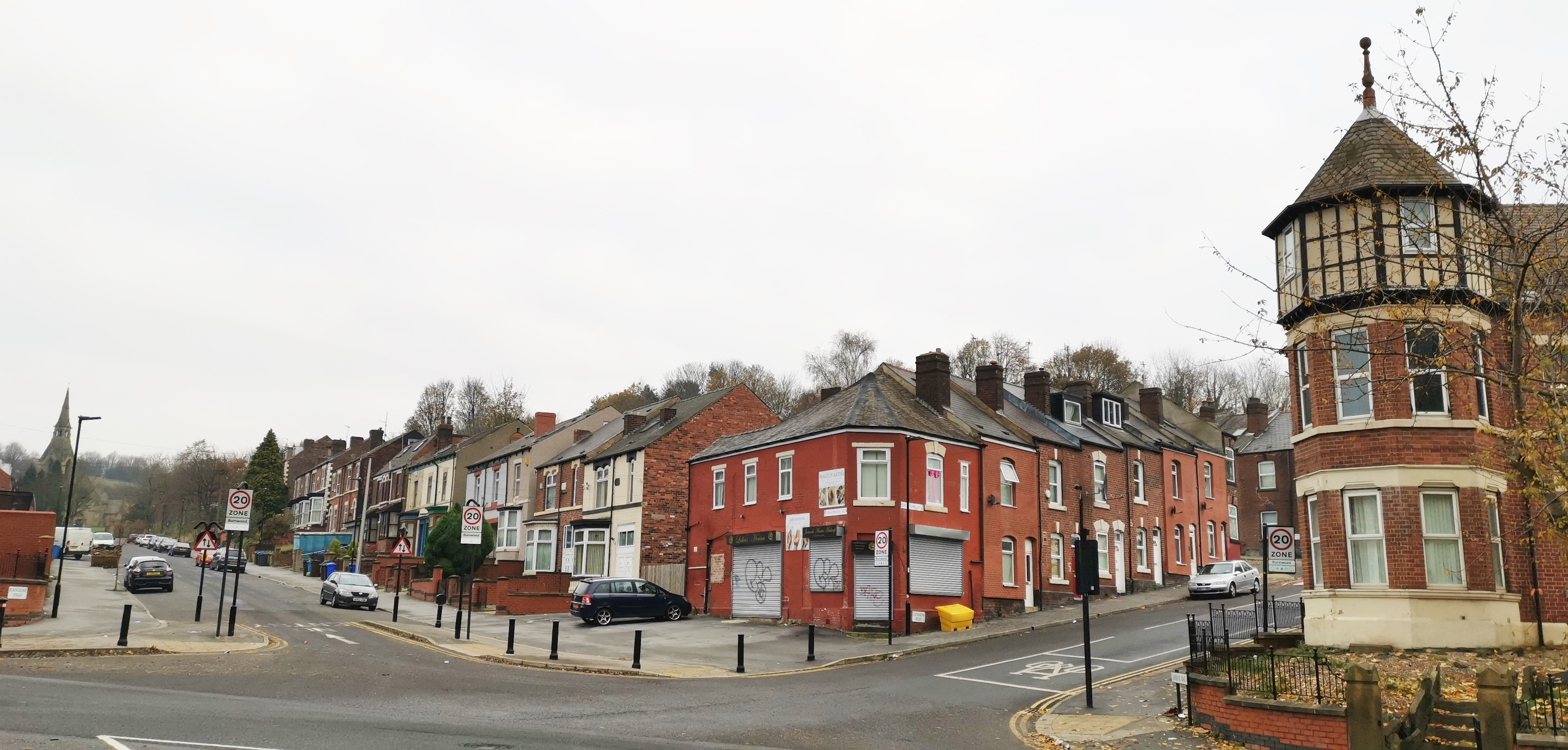
Burngreave

Sheffield Brightside and Hillsborough is a constituency in South Yorkshire in England. It covers the northern neighbourhoods of the city of Sheffield, including Brightside, Hillsborough, Burngreave, Pitsmoor, Shiregreen, Longley, Shirecliffe, Southey, Wisewood, Wadsley, Wadsley Bridge and Parson Cross.

Sheffield is traditionally an industrial city that grew rapidly during the late 18th and early 19th centuries, with steelmaking and coal mining being the predominant industries. Much of the city was redeveloped after World War II; the city's steel industry made it a target for the Luftwaffe in the Sheffield Blitz. This constituency is one of the most deprived in the country. Most residents live in council estates made up of semi-detached or terraced housing and around half of households are socially rented. The constituency's average house price is less than half the UK average.

Residents of Sheffield Brightside and Hillsborough have a below-average age with a low proportion of retirees. They have low levels of income and homeownership and the child poverty rate is more than double the nationwide figure. Residents generally have low levels of education and a high proportion work in the health and manufacturing sectors. The percentage claiming unemployment benefits is high. White people made up 69% of the population at the 2021 census. Asians, mostly of Pakistani origin, were the largest ethnic minority group at 13% and made up nearly half the population in the Pitsmoor area. Black people were 8% of residents.

At the local city council, most of the constituency is represented by the Labour Party with some Green Party councillors in the neighbourhoods in the south and west of the constituency and Reform UK councillors in the north and east. Voters in Sheffield Brightside and Hillsborough strongly supported leaving the European Union in the 2016 referendum; an estimated 63% voted in favour of Brexit compared to the UK-wide figure of 52%.

== History ==
Following its review of parliamentary representation in South Yorkshire the Boundary Commission for England recommended substantial changes to the constituency boundaries in Sheffield, to add part of the Sheffield Hillsborough to the whole of the Sheffield Brightside constituency (other than a handful of houses in the corner of Walkley). The rest of the Sheffield Hillsborough constituency formed the southern half of the new Penistone and Stocksbridge seat.

Since its creation, the seat has elected members of the Labour Party; the last instance of either of the two predecessor seats being held by an MP from a party other than Labour was, for both, the period prior to the 1935 general election. Majorities since World War II have been substantial, suggesting a safe seat on historic voting preferences.

The constituency's representative from 2010 to 2015 was David Blunkett, who also represented the predecessor Sheffield Brightside constituency since 1987. Blunkett was a former frontbench senior minister who was a Secretary of State from 1997 until 2005 in the Blair ministry. He served the first four years of government as the Secretary of State for Education and Employment, three years as the Home Secretary and six months as Secretary of State for Work and Pensions. Blunkett retired from Parliament at the 2015 general election after representing Brightside/Brightside and Hillsborough for 28 years, the longest of any MP for the seat. The constituency representative from 2015 was Harry Harpham until he died on 4 February 2016. He was succeeded by his widow, Gill Furniss, who won a by-election on 5 May 2016.

== Boundaries ==
The City of Sheffield wards of Burngreave, Firth Park, Hillsborough, Shiregreen and Brightside, and Southey.

From the 2024 election minor amendments were made to reflect modifications to ward boundaries.

== Members of Parliament ==
Election	Member	Party
2010	David Blunkett	Labour
2015	Harry Harpham	Labour
2016 by-election	Gill Furniss	Labour

== Elections ==
=== Elections in the 2020s ===
General election 2024: Sheffield Brightside and Hillsborough
Party	Candidate	Votes	%	±%
Labour	Gill Furniss	16,301	51.6	−5.0
Green	Christine Kubo	4,701	14.9	+11.9
Conservative	Aaron Jacob	4,069	12.9	−12.5
Independent	Maxine Bowler	2,537	8.0	N/A
Liberal Democrats	Will Sapwell	1,694	5.4	+1.5
Workers Party	Mark Tyler	1,437	4.5	N/A
SDP	Jeremy Turner	873	2.8	N/A
Majority		11,600	36.7	+5.5
Turnout		31,612	44.9	−11.8
Registered electors		70,453		
Labour hold		Swing	−8.5	

=== Elections in the 2010s ===
2019 notional result
Party	Vote	%
Labour	22,838	56.6
Conservative	10,247	25.4
Brexit Party	3,916	9.7
Liberal Democrats	1,570	3.9
Green	1,210	3.0
Others	585	1.4
Turnout	40,366	56.7
Electorate	71,154	

General election 2019: Sheffield Brightside & Hillsborough
Party	Candidate	Votes	%	±%
Labour	Gill Furniss	22,369	56.5	−10.8
Conservative	Hannah Westropp	10,095	25.5	+3.9
Brexit Party	Johnny Johnson	3,855	9.7	New
Liberal Democrats	Stephen Porter	1,517	3.8	+1.3
Green	Christine Kubo	1,179	3.0	+1.2
UKIP	Shane Harper	585	1.5	−4.8
Majority		12,274	31.0	−14.7
Turnout		39,600	57.1	−2.5
Labour hold		Swing		

General election 2017: Sheffield Brightside and Hillsborough
Party	Candidate	Votes	%	±%
Labour	Gill Furniss	28,193	67.3	+10.7
Conservative	Michael Naughton	9,050	21.6	+10.6
UKIP	Shane Harper	2,645	6.3	−15.8
Liberal Democrats	Simon Clement-Jones	1,061	2.5	−2.0
Green	Christine Kubo	737	1.8	−2.5
Workers Revolutionary	Mike Driver	137	0.3	New
SDP	Muzafar Rahman	47	0.1	New
Majority		19,143	45.7	+11.2
Turnout		41,870	59.6	+4.8
Labour hold		Swing	+0.1	

By-election 2016: Sheffield Brightside and Hillsborough
Party	Candidate	Votes	%	±%
Labour	Gill Furniss	14,087	62.5	+5.9
UKIP	Steven Winstone	4,497	20.0	−2.1
Liberal Democrats	Shaffaq Mohammed	1,385	6.1	+1.6
Conservative	Spencer Pitfield	1,267	5.6	−5.4
Green	Christine Kubo	938	4.2	−0.1
Yorkshire First	Stevie Manion	349	1.5	New
Give Me Back Elmo	Bobby Smith	58	0.2	New
Majority		9,590	42.5	+8.0
Turnout		22,581	33.2	−21.6
Labour hold		Swing	+4.1	

General election 2015: Sheffield Brightside and Hillsborough
Party	Candidate	Votes	%	±%
Labour	Harry Harpham	22,663	56.6	+1.6
UKIP	John Booker	8,856	22.1	+18.0
Conservative	Elise Dünweber	4,407	11.0	−0.5
Liberal Democrats	Jonathan Harston	1,802	4.5	−15.5
Green	Christine Kubo	1,712	4.3	New
TUSC	Maxine Bowler	442	1.1	−0.6
English Democrat	Justin Saxton	171	0.4	New
Majority		13,807	34.5	−0.5
Turnout		40,053	54.8	−2.3
Labour hold		Swing	−8.2	

General election 2010: Sheffield Brightside and Hillsborough
Party	Candidate	Votes	%	±%
Labour	David Blunkett*	21,400	55.0	−14.6
Liberal Democrats	Jonathan Harston	7,768	20.0	+6.9
Conservative	John Sharp	4,468	11.5	+1.7
BNP	John Sheldon	3,026	7.8	+3.2
UKIP	Patricia Sullivan	1,596	4.1	+1.1
TUSC	Maxine Bowler	656	1.7	New
Majority		13,632	35.0	−21.5
Turnout		38,914	57.5	+7.1
Labour win (new seat)				

* Served as an MP in the 2005–2010 Parliament

== See also ==
- List of parliamentary constituencies in South Yorkshire
- List of parliamentary constituencies in the Yorkshire and the Humber (region)
