= DNA Bioscience =

DNA Bioscience is a DNA testing company offering a DNA paternity testing service in the United Kingdom. It was founded in 2003 and ended within two years.

The company gained much press in 2005 when the UK politician David Blunkett bought shares in the company, shortly after which he became Secretary of State for Work and Pensions. He failed to declare his interest in the company, which ultimately led to his resignation from the Cabinet in November 2005.

The company went into liquidation on 8 December 2005 and was bought by an American-based DNA testing laboratory.
