= 2016 Sheffield Brightside and Hillsborough by-election =

Coordinates: 53.411°N 1.452°W

- 5 May 2016

Sheffield Brightside and Hillsborough constituency Triggered by vacation of seat by incumbent
- Turnout: 33.2%
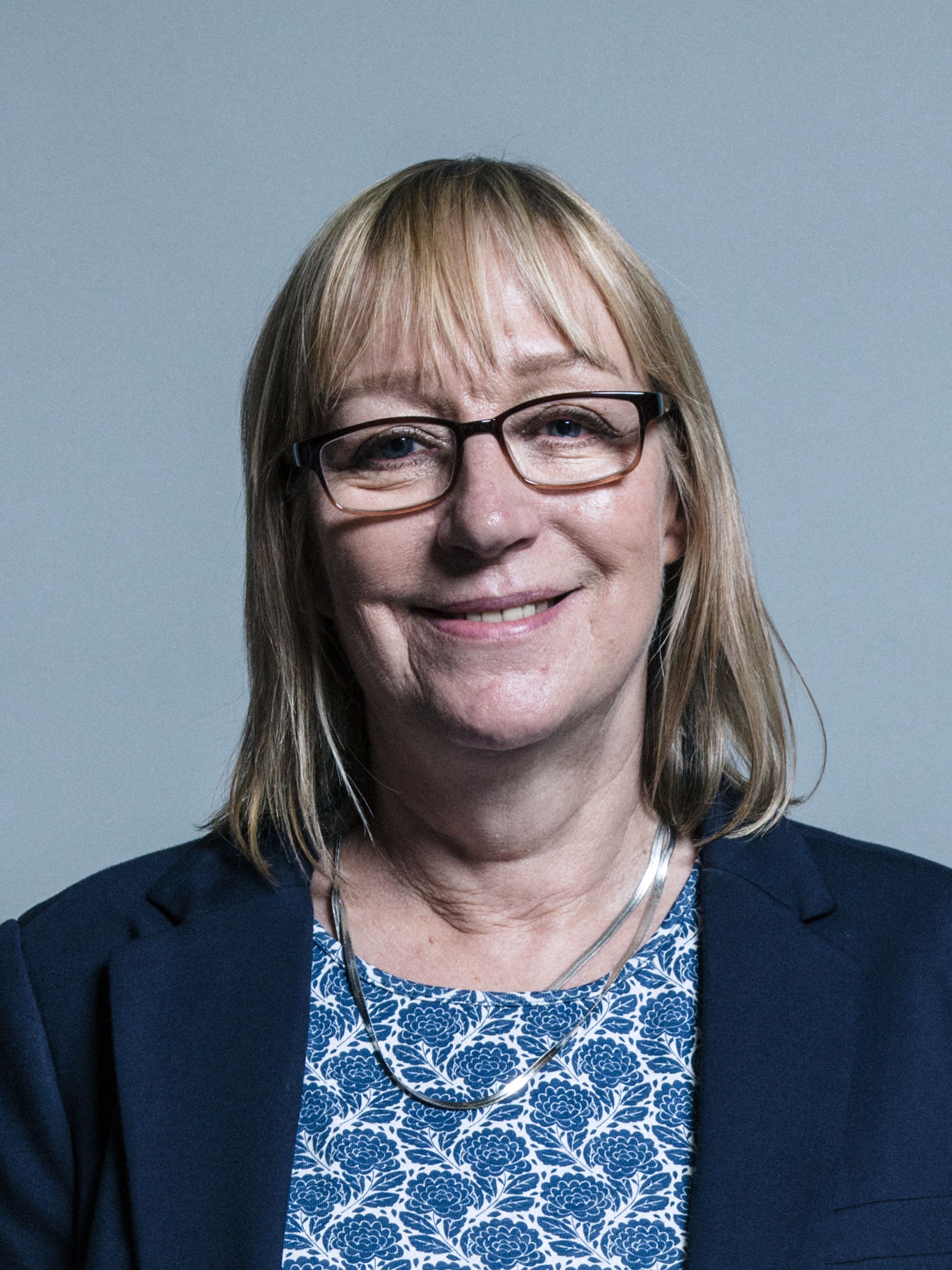

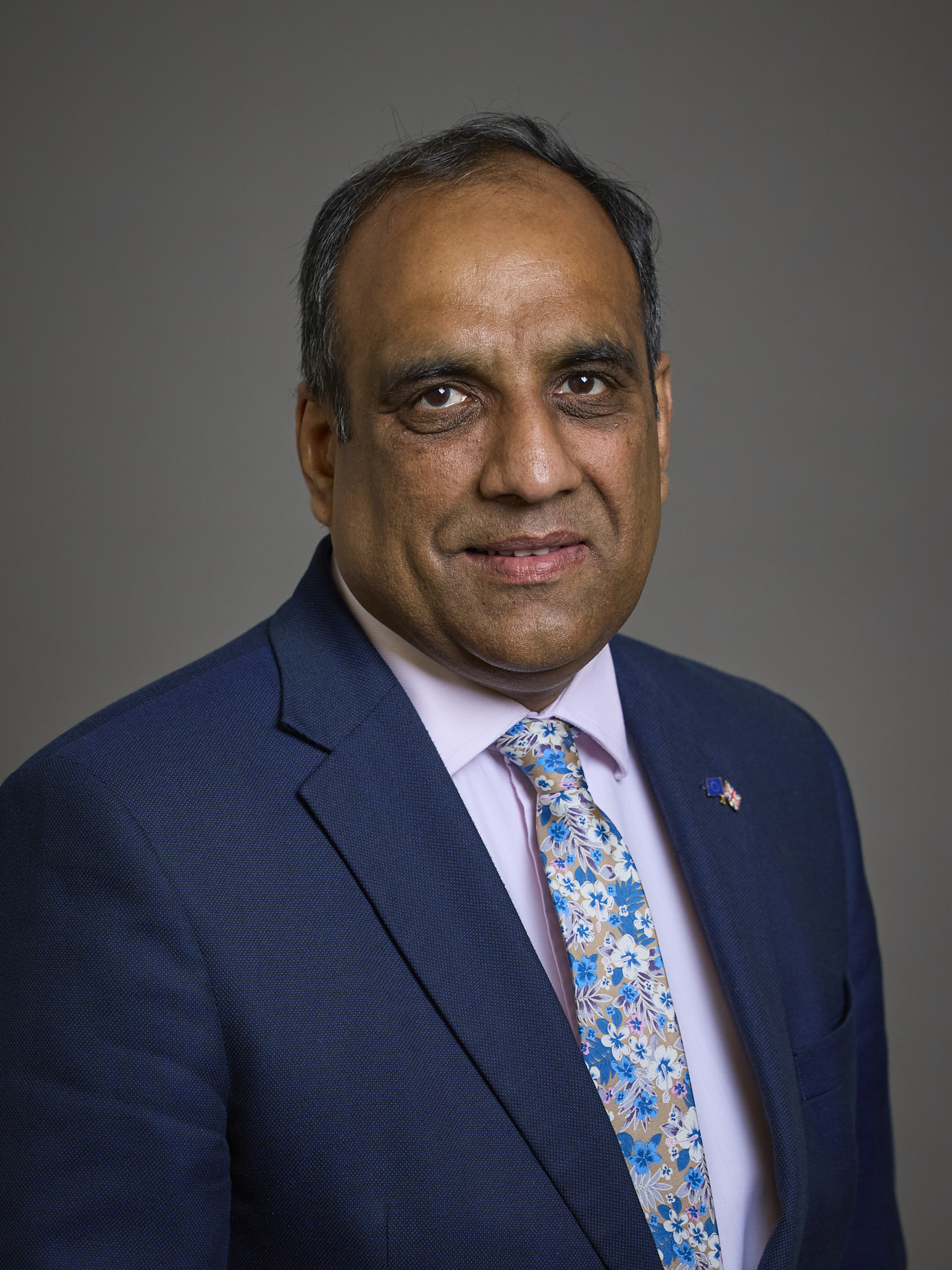
	First party	Second party
Candidate	Gill Furniss	Steven Winstone
Party	Labour	UKIP
Popular vote	14,087	4,497
Percentage	62.4%	19.9%
Swing	▲5.9pp	▼2.2pp
	Third party	Fourth party
Candidate	Shaffaq Mohammed	Spencer Pitfield
Party	Liberal Democrats	Conservative
Popular vote	1,385	1,267
Percentage	6.1%	5.6%
Swing	▲1.6pp	▼5.4pp
MP before election
Harry Harpham
Labour
Elected MP
Gill Furniss
Labour

A by-election for the United Kingdom parliamentary constituency of Sheffield Brightside and Hillsborough was held on 5 May 2016, following the death of incumbent Labour Party Member of Parliament (MP) Harry Harpham. It was won by Gill Furniss—Harpham's widow—also of Labour.

It took place on the same day as the 2016 Ogmore by-election and local elections across the UK.

== Background and candidates ==
Harry Harpham had been the Labour Party MP for the seat since the 2015 general election; he died on 4 February 2016 after just nine months in office. The writ to trigger a by-election to fill the seat was moved on 24 March.

Sheffield City Council published the statement of persons nominated on 8 April This showed that seven candidates would contest the by-election.

The Labour candidate was Gill Furniss, a Sheffield city councillor and the widow of Harry Harpham. Furniss was previously the Labour candidate in Sheffield Hallam at the 2001 general election, where she came third.

UKIP's candidate was Steven Winstone, a local metal trader and businessman. He focused his campaign on protecting jobs in the local steel industry. He had stood for the party in Sheffield South East in the 2015 general election, where he came second.

The Conservatives selected Spencer Pitfield.

The Liberal Democrats selected Shaffaq Mohammed, a city councillor.

The Green Party reselected Christine Gilligan Kubo, a lecturer at Sheffield Business School, and their candidate from the 2015 general election.

Bobby Smith of the New Fathers 4 Justice campaign announced that he would stand in the by-election. He stood under the label "Give Me Back Elmo". He had contested the 2015 general election under the same description in Prime Minister David Cameron's Witney constituency, but took only 37 votes. Smith, of Stevenage, also contested the borough council election in his home town on the same day as the by-election.

Yorkshire First selected Stevie Manion.

== Result ==
By-election 2016: Sheffield Brightside and Hillsborough
Party	Candidate	Votes	%	±%
Labour	Gill Furniss	14,087	62.4	+5.9
UKIP	Steven Winstone	4,497	19.9	–2.2
Liberal Democrats	Shaffaq Mohammed	1,385	6.1	+1.6
Conservative	Spencer Pitfield	1,267	5.6	–5.4
Green	Christine Gilligan Kubo	938	4.2	–0.1
Yorkshire First	Stevie Manion	349	1.5	New
Give Me Back Elmo	Bobby Smith	58	0.2	New
Majority		9,590	42.5	+8.8
Turnout		22,581	33.2	–21.6
Labour hold		Swing	+4.1	

== Previous result ==
General election 2015: Sheffield Brightside and Hillsborough
Party	Candidate	Votes	%	±%
Labour	Harry Harpham	22,663	56.6	+1.6
UKIP	John Booker	8,856	22.1	+18.0
Conservative	Elise Dünweber	4,407	11.0	–0.5
Liberal Democrats	Jonathan Harston	1,802	4.5	–15.5
Green	Christine Gilligan Kubo	1,712	4.3	New
TUSC	Maxine Bowler	442	1.1	–0.6
English Democrat	Justin Saxton	171	0.4	New
Majority		13,807	34.6	–0.4
Turnout		40,053	54.8	–2.3
Labour hold		Swing	–8.2	

== See also ==
- List of United Kingdom by-elections (2010–present)

== Notes and references ==
Notes
