= Darnall (ward) =

Electoral ward in the City of Sheffield, South Yorkshire, England

Coordinates: 53.386°N 1.409°W

- Shown within Sheffield
- Population: 23,489 (2011 census)
- Metropolitan borough: City of Sheffield
- Metropolitan county: South Yorkshire
- Region: Yorkshire and the Humber
- Country: England
- Sovereign state: United Kingdom
- UK Parliament: Sheffield Attercliffe
- Councillors: Dianne Hurst (Labour Party); Mazher Iqbal (Labour Party); Mary Lea (Labour Party)

Darnall ward—which includes the districts of Attercliffe, Carbrook, Darnall, Tinsley, and parts of Handsworth—is one of the 28 electoral wards in City of Sheffield, South Yorkshire, England. It is located in the eastern part of the city and covers an area of 17.4 km^{2}. The population of this ward in 2011 was 23,489 people in 8,809 households. It is one of the wards that made up the Sheffield Attercliffe constituency, now the Sheffield South East constituency.

== Districts of Darnall ward ==
=== Attercliffe ===
Attercliffe (grid reference SK378887) is an industrial suburb of northeast Sheffield.

Attercliffe stretches from the edge of the city centre of Sheffield to Carbrook.

Back in the 1880s, the district was populated by small terraced houses and a shopping area which stretched for over 3 miles along Attercliffe Road, Attercliffe Common and Sheffield Road towards Tinsley.

Remnants of this era still stand with the John Banner building, an early multi floor department store located on Attercliffe Road. Other buildings include the Adelphi cinema, Attercliffe Baths, Burton Building, Carbrook Hall and Attercliffe Church - a small building easy to miss tucked back from the main road into the city centre.

As for industry, Tinsley Wire and many other steelworks and light industrial companies survived alongside residential and small retail.

During the December 1940 a German bombing campaign devastated the city centre of Sheffield. Attercliffe was also badly destroyed with destruction from the city centre across to Tinsley canal locks. It took until the 1990s rebuilding of the old residential area to re-use the former area of the district affected by this historic incident.

Traditional areas of Attercliffe now house an interesting mix of old established industry, Adult stores, carpet warehouses and discount stores - including the old John Banner building. Towards the east end of Attercliffe, the area has been regenerated with medium-sized business and a few remaining large steelworks.

=== Carbrook ===
Carbrook (grid reference SK390900) is an industrial area of Sheffield, to the north-east of Brightside.

=== Darnall ===
Darnall (grid reference SK388880) is a suburb of eastern Sheffield.

=== Tinsley ===
Tinsley (grid reference SK395907) is a district in the northeastern part of Sheffield.

=== Meadowhall ===
'Meadowhall' is the name of a large shopping centre in the Darnall ward.(grid reference SK392909)
