= Southey, South Yorkshire =

Electoral ward in the City of Sheffield, South Yorkshire, England

Coordinates: 53.418°N 1.478°W

Southey
- Shown within Sheffield
- Area: 1.8 sq mi (4.7 km^{2})
- Population: 20,000
  - Density: 11,111/sq mi (4,290/km^{2})
- Metropolitan borough: City of Sheffield
- Metropolitan county: South Yorkshire
- Region: Yorkshire and the Humber
- Country: England
- Sovereign state: United Kingdom
- UK Parliament: Sheffield Brightside & Hillsborough
- Councillors: Gareth Slater (Labour Party); Mike Chaplin (Labour Party); Jayne Dunn (Labour Party)

Southey ward—which includes the districts of Fox Hill, New Parson Cross, Southey, Wadsley Bridge, and part of Old Parson Cross—is one of the 28 electoral wards in City of Sheffield, England. It is located in the northern part of the city and covers an area of 1.8 square miles (1,200 acres; 4.7 km^{2}). The population of this ward in 2011 was 19,086 people in 8,295 households. It is one of the wards that make up the Sheffield Brightside and Hillsborough constituency.

== Districts of Southey ward ==
=== Southey ===
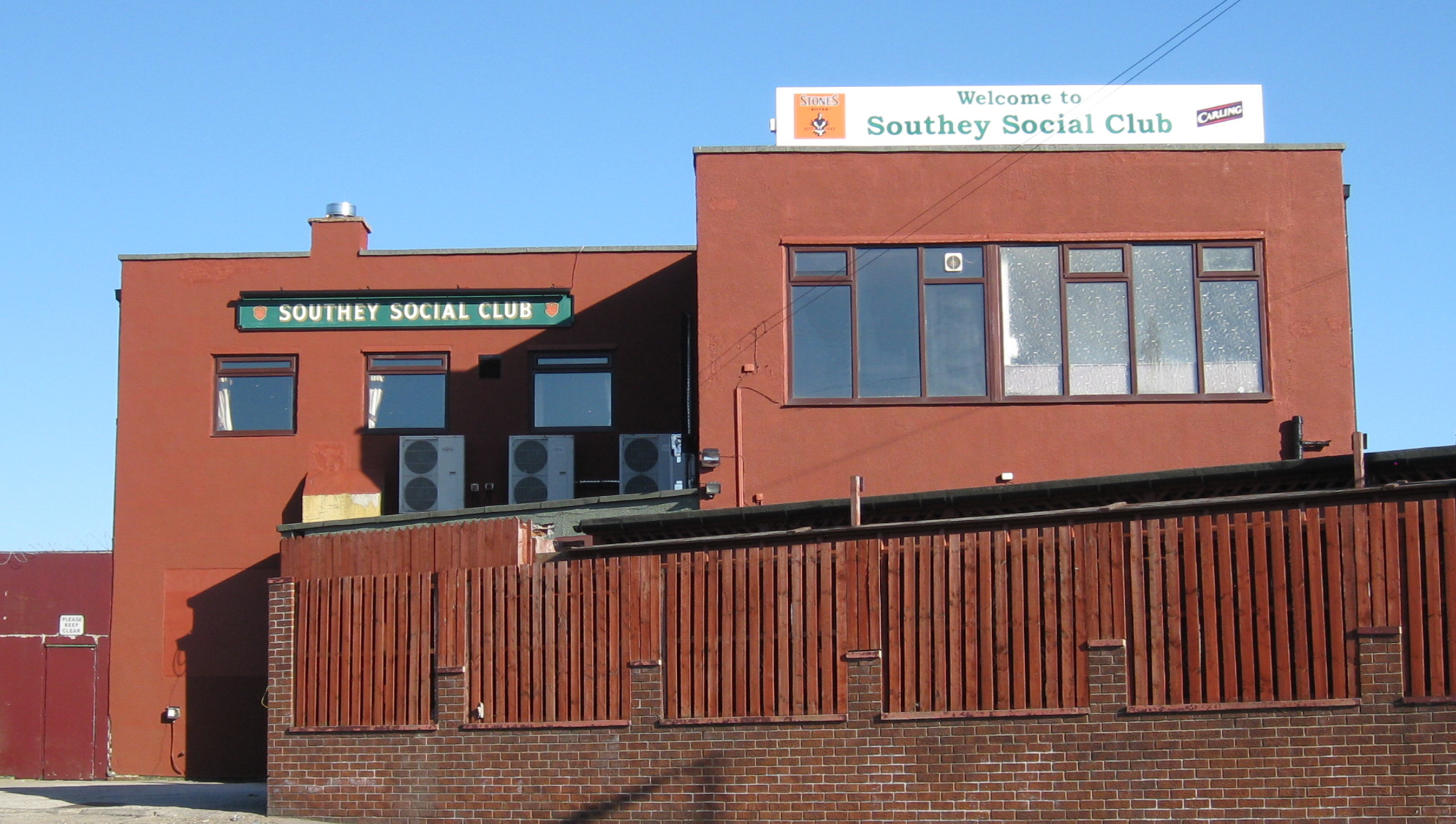
Southey Social Club, Southey Green Road

Southey (grid reference SK345915) is a former village, now a district and housing estate in the northeast part of Sheffield. By 1971, J. Edward Vickers noted that "not one vestige of the old Southey remains". Particular landmarks in Southey include Southey Green and Cookson Park. The area had a population of 14,253 in 2011.

=== Birley Carr ===
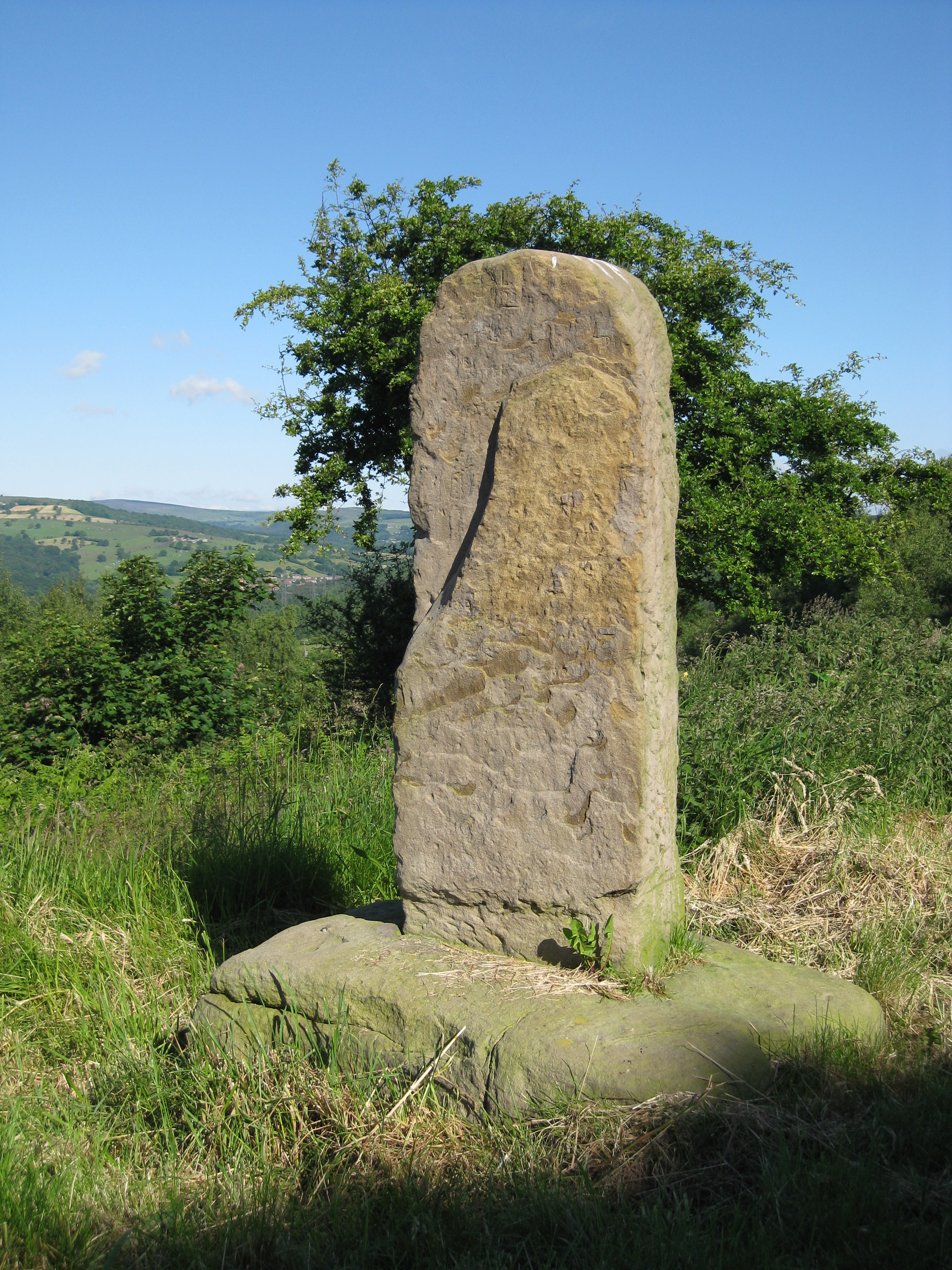
The Birley Stone

Birley Carr (grid reference SK333921) is a suburb of Sheffield. It lies by Birley Edge, an inland cliff. At the northern end of Birley Edge is the Birley Stone. A reference from the 1790s refers to a cross on Birley Edge, which the Stone may be the remains of. The small hamlet of Birley Edge includes several listed buildings including Birley Old Hall.

=== Fox Hill ===
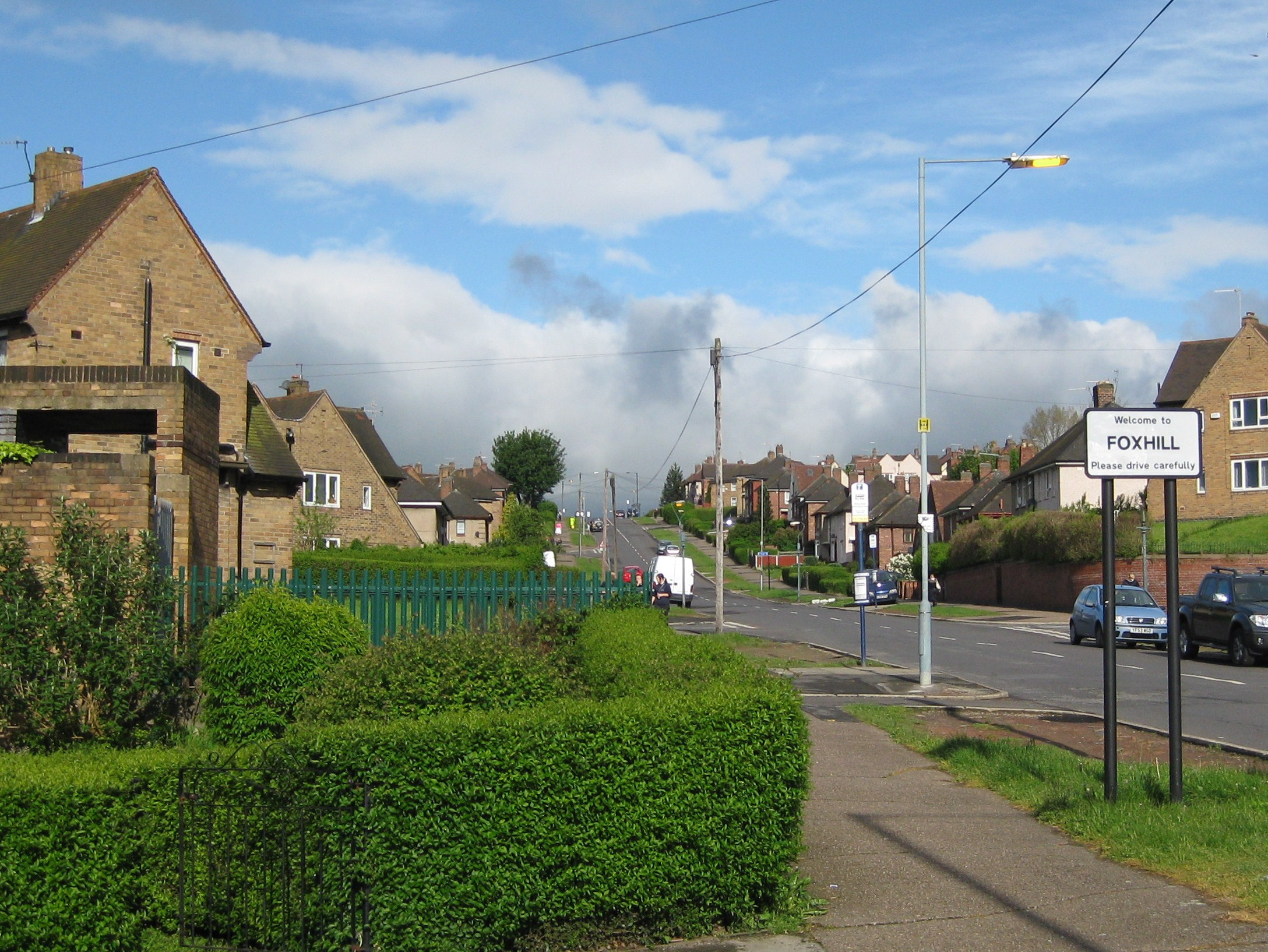
Welcome to Fox Hill

Fox Hill or Foxhill, as the name suggests, is a hill rising westward from the A61 road, north of Birley Carr and south of Grenoside. It also rises northwards, giving views towards the city centre in the south. The western side is a ridge (Birley Edge) dropping sharply into the Don Valley. It is a residential area with a mix of private and council housing (much from the 1960s) with some green spaces currently (2009) undergoing some redevelopment, particularly on the western side. There is a small row of shops opposite The Fox public house on Fox Hill Road. It is served by the number 32,32a,135,m92 and 86 buses.

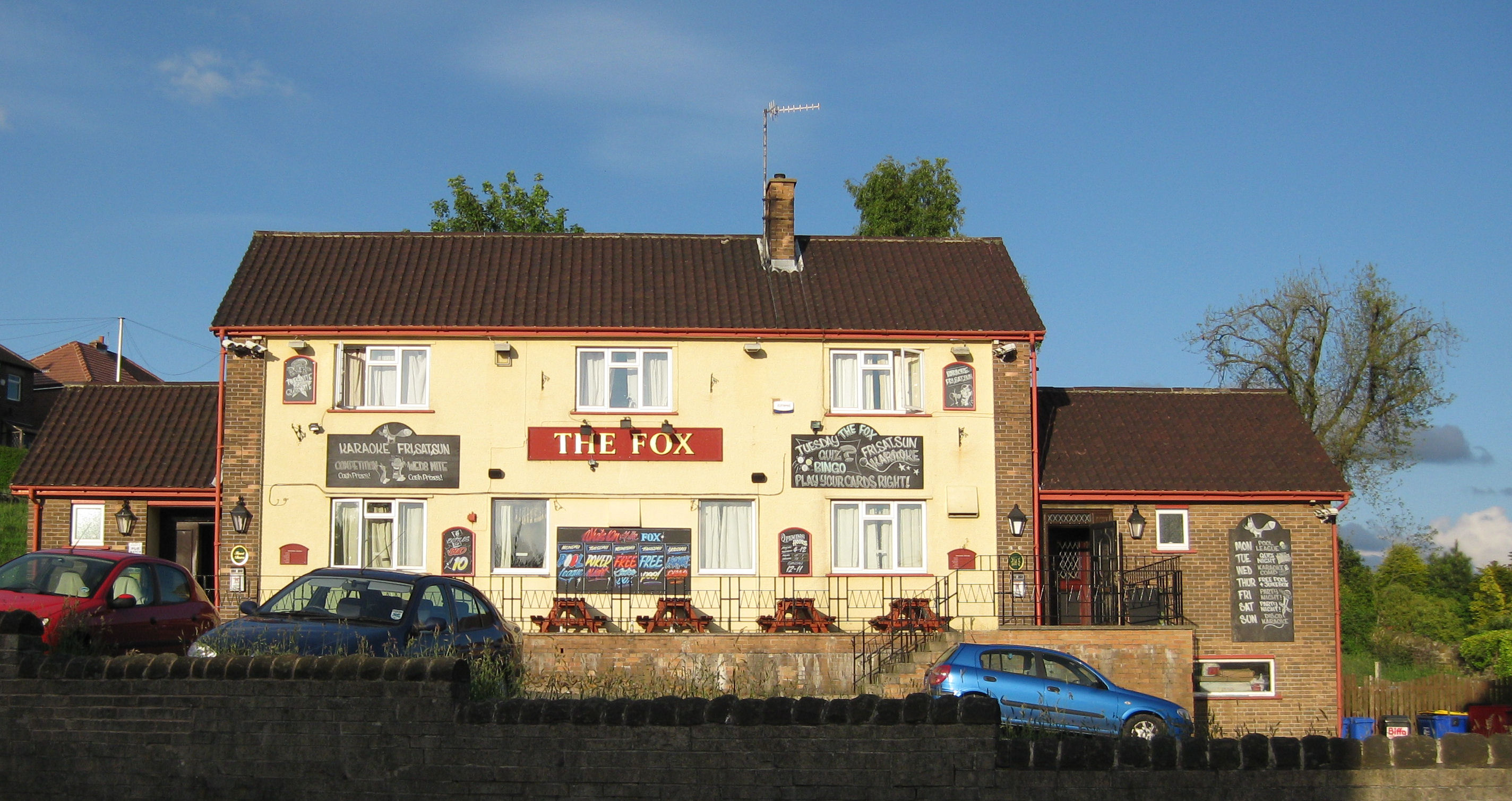
The Fox, Fox Hill Road

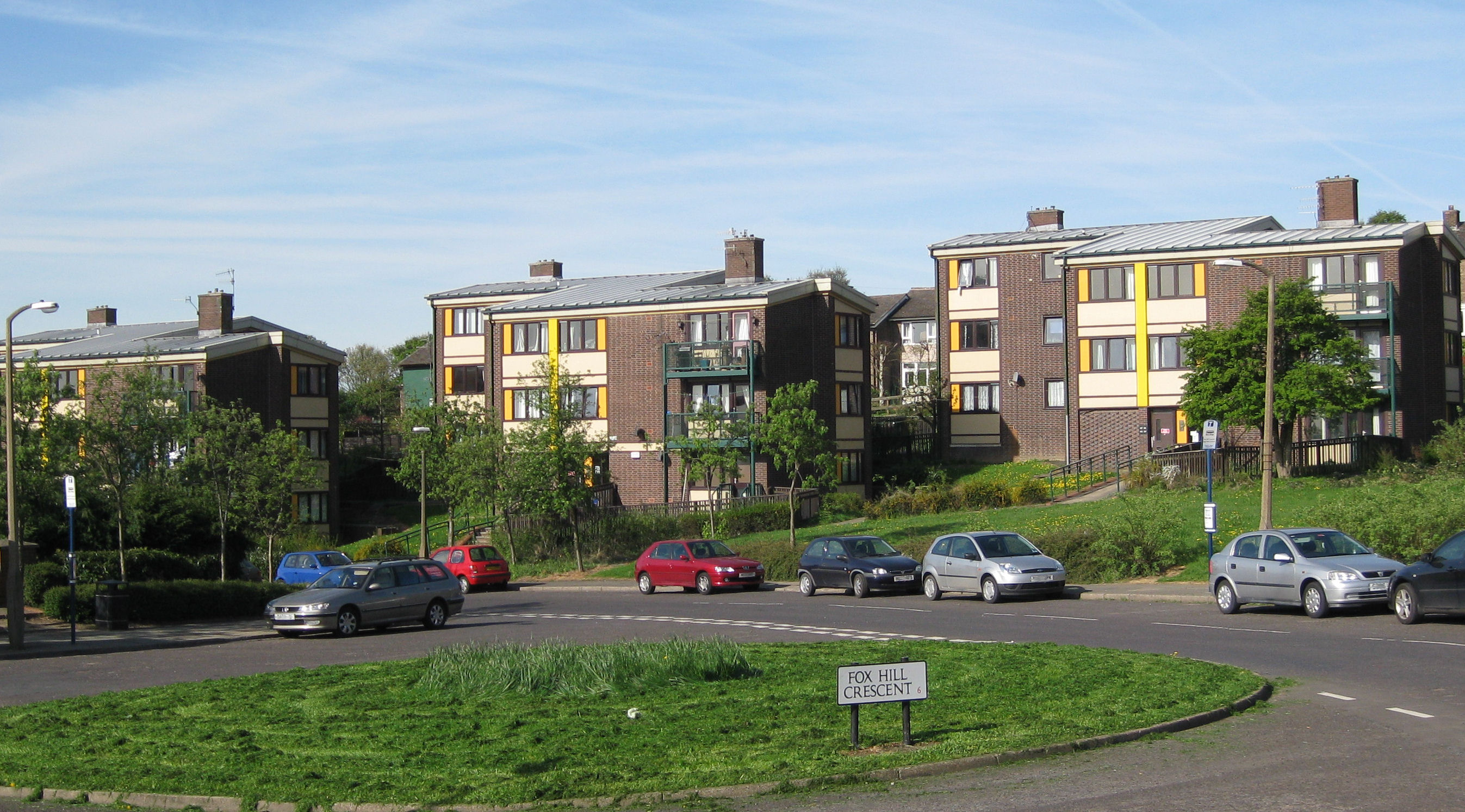
Fox Hill Crescent, 21st century housing

=== Parson Cross ===
Parson Cross is a residential area east of the A61, opposite Fox Hill and south of Grenoside. Most of it is in the Firth Park ward.

=== New Parson Cross ===
New Parson Cross is an estate in the north-east of Parson Cross, built after the Second World War, and thus distinct from the pre-war "Old" Parson Cross estates. As of 2009 was undergoing re-development. It contains St Paul's Church, Wordsworth Avenue, designed by architect Sir Basil Spence.

=== Wadsley Bridge ===
Wadsley bridge (grid reference SK332913) is a former hamlet, now a district of Sheffield. It lies to the west of Southey around what used to be a ford across the River Don.
