= Shaffaq Mohammed, Baron Mohammed of Tinsley =

British politician (born 1972)

The Right Honourable The Lord Mohammed of Tinsley MBE
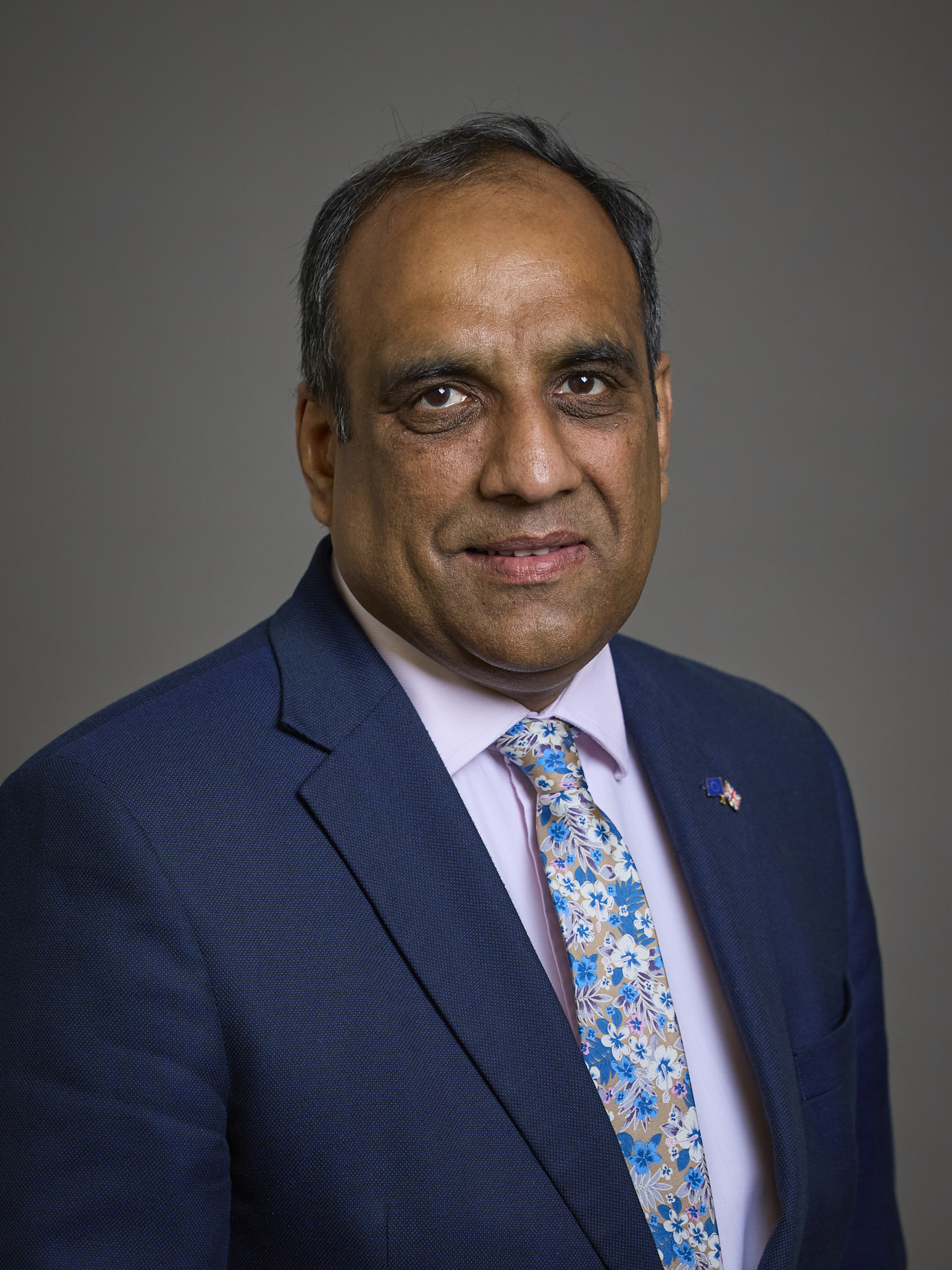
- Official portrait, 2025

Member of the House of Lords
- Lord Temporal
- Life peerage 21 February 2025

Member of the European Parliament for Yorkshire and the Humber
- In office 2 July 2019 – 31 January 2020
- Preceded by: John Procter
- Succeeded by: Constituency abolished

Personal details
- Born: 21 July 1972 (age 54) Mirpur, Azad Kashmir, Pakistan
- Party: Liberal Democrats
- Education: University of Sheffield

Shaffaq Mohammed, Baron Mohammed of Tinsley (born 21 July 1972) is a British politician and life peer. He served as a Liberal Democrats Member of the European Parliament (MEP) for the Yorkshire and the Humber from 2019 until Brexit in 2020. He unsuccessfully stood as the Liberal Democrat candidate for the House of Commons in three elections for seats in Sheffield. In February 2025, he became a member of the House of Lords.

== Early life ==
Mohammed was born on 21 July 1972 in Mirpur, a city in Pakistan-administered Kashmir. He was aged four when his family moved to the United Kingdom. In April 1977 he moved to Sheffield and studied at Park House school. He left school at 16 and was employed through the Youth Training Scheme, while also studying for A-levels at Loxley College. As a mature student, he studied for a degree in business from the University of Sheffield. He then worked as a youth worker in Sheffield.

== Political career ==
=== Sheffield City Council ===
Between 2004 and 2014 Mohammed served as the Liberal Democrat councillor for Broomhill Ward on Sheffield City Council. He contested Crookes Ward in 2014 and was defeated. He returned as a councillor for Ecclesall Ward in 2016 and was re-elected in 2018.

Mohammed was elected as leader of the Liberal Democrat Group on Sheffield City Council in May 2011. He lost this position when he lost his seat as a councillor in 2014. Following his return to the council he was re-elected as group leader in May 2016.

In the 2015 Dissolution Honours, Mohammed was appointed a Member of the Order of the British Empire (MBE) "for political service" as a councillor on Sheffield City Council.

=== European Parliament ===
Mohammed served as a Liberal Democrats Member of the European Parliament (MEP) for the Yorkshire and the Humber from 2019 to 2020. He lost his seat when the United Kingdom left the European Union on 31 January 2020.

=== UK Parliament ===
==== House of Commons ====
Mohammed stood as the Liberal Democrat candidate in the 2016 Sheffield Brightside and Hillsborough by-election, where he finished third with 6.1% of the vote.

Mohammed was the Liberal Democrat candidate for the Sheffield Central constituency in the 2017 general election, coming fourth with 5.1% of the vote.

Mohammed was selected in 2023 to contest former Liberal Democrat leader Nick Clegg's seat of Sheffield Hallam at the 2024 general election. Sheffield Hallam was considered to be a marginal seat between Labour and the Liberal Democrats. Mohammed finished second to Olivia Blake of Labour, with 30.4% of the vote.

==== House of Lords ====
In December 2024, as part of the 2024 Political Peerages, it was announced that Mohammed would receive a life peerage to sit in the House of Lords. He was created Baron Mohammed of Tinsley, of Sheffield in the County of South Yorkshire on 21 February 2025, and sits as a Liberal Democrat member of the House of Lords. On 1 May 2025, he made his maiden speech during a debate on the Children's Wellbeing and Schools Bill.
