= 2006 Sheffield City Council election =

Council elections

| ← 2004 | 4 May 2006 | 2007 → |

One third of seats (29 of 84) to Sheffield City Council 43 seats needed for a majority
| | First party | Second party |
|---|---|---|
| Party | Liberal Democrats | Labour |
| Seats won | 14 | 14 |
| Seat change | ▼1 | 0 |
| | Third party | Fourth party |
| Party | Green | Conservative |
| Seats won | 1 | 0 |
| Seat change | ▲1 | 0 |
- Map showing the results of the 2006 Sheffield City Council elections
Majority party before election
Labour
Majority party after election
Labour

Sheffield City Council elections took place on Thursday 4 May 2006 with polling stations open between 7am and 10pm. One third of council seats were up for election; one in each ward, plus one additional seat in Ecclesall due to a resignation. The overall turnout this year was 34.5%, down considerably from the previous year's general election turnout at 43.9 per cent turnout in Sheffield.

== Councillors before and after the election ==
| Ward | Incumbent elected | Incumbent | Elected |
|---|---|---|---|
| Arbourthorne | 2004 | Timothy Rippon | Timothy Rippon |
| Beauchief & Greenhill | 2004 | Clive Skelton | Clive Skelton |
| Beighton | 2004 | Helen Mirfin-Boukouris | Helen Mirfin-Boukouris |
| Birley | 2004 | Michael Pye | Michael Pye |
| Broomhill | 2004 | Shaffaq Mohammed | Shaffaq Mohammed |
| Burngreave | 2004 | Steve Jones | Steve Jones |
| Central | 2004 | Mohammad Azim | Bernard Little |
| Crookes | 2004 | Sylvia Anginotti | Sylvia Anginotti |
| Darnall | 2004 | Mohammad Altaf | Mazher Iqbal |
| Dore & Totley | 2004 | Keith Hill | Keith Hill |
| East Ecclesfield | 2004 | Graham Oxley | Graham Oxley |
| Ecclesall 1 | 2004 | Roger Davison | Roger Davison |
| Ecclesall 2 | 2004 | Kate Dawson | Michael Reynolds |
| Firth Park | 2004 | Alan Law | Alan Law |
| Fulwood | 2004 | Janice Sidebottom | Janice Sidebottom |
| Gleadless Valley | 2004 | Garry Weatherall | Garry Weatherall |
| Graves Park | 2004 | Barrie Jervis | Robert McCann |
| Hillsborough | 2004 | Janet Bragg | Janet Bragg |
| Manor Castle | 2004 | Janet Wilson | Janet Wilson |
| Mosborough | 2004 | Samuel Wall | Samuel Wall |
| Nether Edge | 2004 | Patricia White | Patricia White |
| Richmond | 2004 | Terry Barrow | Elizabeth Naylor |
| Shiregreen & Brightside | 2004 | Peter Rippon | Peter Rippon |
| Southey | 2004 | Gillian Furniss | Gillian Furniss |
| Stannington | 2004 | David Baker | David Baker |
| Stocksbridge & Upper Don | 2004 | Alison Brelsford | Alison Brelsford |
| Walkley | 2004 | Jonathan Harston | Jonathan Harston |
| West Ecclesfield | 2004 | Trevor Bagshaw | Trevor Bagshaw |
| Woodhouse | 2004 | Raymond Satur | Raymond Satur |

== Election result ==
Sheffield City Council election result 2006
| Party | Seats | Gains | Losses | Net gain/loss | Seats % | Votes % | Votes | +/− |
|---|---|---|---|---|---|---|---|---|
| Liberal Democrats | 14 | 0 | 1 | -1 | 48.3 | 34.0 | 42,533 | +3.2 |
| Labour | 14 | 0 | 0 | 0 | 48.3 | 33.7 | 42,191 | -0.7 |
| Conservative | 0 | 0 | 0 | 0 | 0.0 | 15.0 | 18,765 | -0.8 |
| Green | 1 | 1 | 0 | +1 | 3.4 | 10.9 | 13,621 | -1.9 |
| BNP | 0 | 0 | 0 | 0 | 0.0 | 2.3 | 2,906 | -0.9 |
| UKIP | 0 | 0 | 0 | 0 | 0.0 | 2.3 | 2,849 | +0.8 |
| Respect | 0 | 0 | 0 | 0 | 0.0 | 1.0 | 1,208 | N/A |
| CPA | 0 | 0 | 0 | 0 | 0.0 | 0.3 | 395 | N/A |
| Independent | 0 | 0 | 0 | 0 | 0.0 | 0.3 | 337 | -0.3 |
| Socialist Alternative | 0 | 0 | 0 | 0 | 0.0 | 0.2 | 206 | +0.1 |

This result has the following consequences for the total number of seats on the council after the elections:

| Party | Previous council | New council |
|---|---|---|
| Labour | 44 | 44 |
| Liberal Democrats | 37 | 36 |
| Conservatives | 2 | 2 |
| Green | 1 | 2 |
| Total | 84 | 84 |
| Working majority | 4 | 4 |

== Ward results ==
=== Arbourthorne ===
Arbourthorne
| Party | Candidate | Votes | % | ±% |
|---|---|---|---|---|
| Labour | Timothy Rippon* | 1,695 | 49.5 | +0.2 |
| Liberal Democrats | Tony Bennett | 872 | 25.4 | −3.6 |
| Conservative | Peter Smith | 451 | 13.2 | +0.8 |
| Green | Alexa Walker | 288 | 8.4 | −0.5 |
| CPA | Kyle Spotswood | 121 | 3.5 | N/A |
| Majority | | 823 | 24.0 | +3.7 |
| Turnout | | 3,427 | 28.2 | −10.9 |
| Labour hold | | Swing | | |

=== Beauchief & Greenhill ===
Beauchief & Greenhill
| Party | Candidate | Votes | % | ±% |
|---|---|---|---|---|
| Liberal Democrats | Clive Skelton* | 2,134 | 38.7 | +4.9 |
| Labour | Steven Wilson | 1,852 | 33.6 | +1.6 |
| Conservative | Michelle Grant | 628 | 11.4 | −2.8 |
| BNP | John Beatson | 567 | 10.3 | −4.0 |
| Green | David Hayes | 327 | 5.9 | −2.4 |
| Majority | | 282 | 5.1 | +3.3 |
| Turnout | | 5,508 | 41.3 | −7.4 |
| Liberal Democrats hold | | Swing | | |

=== Beighton ===
Beighton
| Party | Candidate | Votes | % | ±% |
|---|---|---|---|---|
| Labour | Helen Mirfin-Boukouris* | 1,655 | 42.7 | +3.9 |
| Conservative | Shirley Clayton | 745 | 19.2 | −3.3 |
| BNP | Roy James | 659 | 17.0 | N/A |
| Liberal Democrats | Allan Wisbey | 564 | 14.5 | +1.2 |
| Green | Andrew Brandram | 255 | 6.6 | −3.6 |
| Majority | | 910 | 23.5 | +7.2 |
| Turnout | | 3,878 | 30.2 | −8.1 |
| Labour hold | | Swing | | |

=== Birley ===
Birley
| Party | Candidate | Votes | % | ±% |
|---|---|---|---|---|
| Labour | Michael Pye* | 2,018 | 49.6 | +3.7 |
| Liberal Democrats | Angela Hill | 766 | 18.8 | −2.6 |
| Conservative | Gordon Millward | 543 | 13.3 | −3.9 |
| Green | Francis Plunkett | 346 | 8.5 | −1.7 |
| UKIP | Sally Stracey | 396 | 9.7 | N/A |
| Majority | | 1,252 | 30.8 | +6.3 |
| Turnout | | 4,069 | 31.6 | −14.5 |
| Labour hold | | Swing | | |

=== Broomhill ===
Broomhill
| Party | Candidate | Votes | % | ±% |
|---|---|---|---|---|
| Liberal Democrats | Shaffaq Mohammed* | 1,239 | 41.6 | +6.4 |
| Green | Robert Cole | 730 | 24.5 | +6.5 |
| Labour | Jennifer Armstrong | 581 | 19.5 | −0.8 |
| Conservative | Michael Ginn | 426 | 14.3 | −0.5 |
| Majority | | 509 | 17.1 | +7.5 |
| Turnout | | 2,976 | 25.4 | −10.3 |
| Liberal Democrats hold | | Swing | | |

=== Burngreave ===
Burngreave
| Party | Candidate | Votes | % | ±% |
|---|---|---|---|---|
| Labour | Steve Jones* | 2,278 | 48.9 | +0.3 |
| Respect | Maxine Bowler | 1,208 | 25.9 | +14.3 |
| Conservative | Russell Cutts | 425 | 9.1 | −1.8 |
| Green | Christopher Sissons | 401 | 8.6 | −8.3 |
| Liberal Democrats | Tasadique Mohammed | 350 | 7.5 | −9.6 |
| Majority | | 1,070 | 23.0 | −8.5 |
| Turnout | | 4,662 | 33.9 | −3.2 |
| Labour hold | | Swing | | |

=== Central ===
Central
| Party | Candidate | Votes | % | ±% |
|---|---|---|---|---|
| Green | Bernard Little | 1,159 | 32.6 | +5.6 |
| Labour | Mohammad Maroof | 1,117 | 31.5 | +4.3 |
| Liberal Democrats | Mohammad Azim* | 1,036 | 29.2 | −3.4 |
| Conservative | Nicholas Bryan | 239 | 6.7 | −3.7 |
| Majority | | 42 | 1.2 | N/A |
| Turnout | | 3,551 | 30.4 | −5.2 |
| Green gain from Liberal Democrats | | Swing | | |

=== Crookes ===
Crookes
| Party | Candidate | Votes | % | ±% |
|---|---|---|---|---|
| Liberal Democrats | Sylvia Anginotti* | 2,470 | 48.6 | +8.7 |
| Conservative | David Robinson | 939 | 18.5 | −3.0 |
| Labour | Felicity Matthews | 823 | 16.2 | −7.6 |
| Green | Julian Briggs | 730 | 14.4 | −7.3 |
| CPA | Stuart Johnson | 116 | 2.3 | N/A |
| Majority | | 1,531 | 30.1 | +14.0 |
| Turnout | | 5,078 | 38.3 | −10.5 |
| Liberal Democrats hold | | Swing | | |

=== Darnall ===
Darnall
| Party | Candidate | Votes | % | ±% |
|---|---|---|---|---|
| Labour | Mazher Iqbal | 2,338 | 54.8 | +18.8 |
| Liberal Democrats | John Bowden | 732 | 17.1 | −8.0 |
| UKIP | Charlotte Arnott | 482 | 11.3 | −5.4 |
| Conservative | Anne Corke | 385 | 9.0 | ±0.0 |
| Green | Julie White | 333 | 7.8 | −1.3 |
| Majority | | 1,606 | 37.6 | +26.7 |
| Turnout | | 4,270 | 31.4 | −11.7 |
| Labour hold | | Swing | | |

=== Dore & Totley ===
Dore & Totley
| Party | Candidate | Votes | % | ±% |
|---|---|---|---|---|
| Liberal Democrats | Keith Hill* | 3,770 | 52.8 | +11.6 |
| Conservative | Janet Chapman | 2,623 | 36.7 | −2.6 |
| Labour | Mohammad Hussain | 300 | 4.2 | −5.3 |
| Green | Dawn Biram | 274 | 3.8 | −4.4 |
| UKIP | James Laurie | 172 | 2.4 | N/A |
| Majority | | 1,147 | 16.1 | N/A |
| Turnout | | 7,139 | 54.3 | −4.9 |
| Liberal Democrats hold | | Swing | | |

=== East Ecclesfield ===
East Ecclesfield
| Party | Candidate | Votes | % | ±% |
|---|---|---|---|---|
| Liberal Democrats | Graham Oxley* | 2,039 | 46.1 | +8.3 |
| Labour | Adele Jagger | 1,565 | 35.4 | +1.8 |
| Conservative | Miles Waters | 441 | 10.0 | +1.2 |
| Green | Lamia Safir | 378 | 8.5 | −0.2 |
| Majority | | 474 | 10.7 | +6.5 |
| Turnout | | 4,423 | 32.3 | −12.5 |
| Liberal Democrats hold | | Swing | | |

=== Ecclesall ===
Ecclesall
| Party | Candidate | Votes | % | ±% |
|---|---|---|---|---|
| Liberal Democrats | Roger Davison* | 3,449 | 54.4 | +6.4 |
| Liberal Democrats | Michael Reynolds | 3,281 | 51.8 | +0.5 |
| Conservative | Michael Young | 1,617 | 25.5 | −4.2 |
| Conservative | Daniel Young | 1,586 | 25.0 | −3.6 |
| Green | Arun Mathur | 789 | 12.4 | −3.3 |
| Labour | James Lafferty | 587 | 9.3 | −6.2 |
| Green | Robert Murphy | 573 | 9.0 | N/A |
| Labour | Neil Cleeveley | 480 | 7.6 | −4.6 |
| CPA | Sidney Cordle | 158 | 2.5 | N/A |
| Majority | | 1,664 | 26.3 | +8.0 |
| Turnout | | 6,339 | 45.8 | −7.7 |
| Liberal Democrats hold | | Swing | | |
| Liberal Democrats hold | | Swing | | |

=== Firth Park ===
Firth Park
| Party | Candidate | Votes | % | ±% |
|---|---|---|---|---|
| Labour | Alan Law* | 1,854 | 55.0 | +7.4 |
| Liberal Democrats | John Tomlinson | 641 | 19.0 | +6.4 |
| Green | Steven Marshall | 441 | 13.1 | −1.9 |
| Conservative | Paul Rymill | 437 | 13.0 | −1.0 |
| Majority | | 1,213 | 36.0 | +4.1 |
| Turnout | | 3,373 | 26.8 | −8.7 |
| Labour hold | | Swing | | |

=== Fulwood ===
Fulwood
| Party | Candidate | Votes | % | ±% |
|---|---|---|---|---|
| Liberal Democrats | Janice Sidebottom* | 2,541 | 47.2 | +2.6 |
| Conservative | Caroline Cooper | 1,818 | 33.8 | +4.1 |
| Green | Laura Anderson | 450 | 8.4 | −5.1 |
| Labour | Martin Newsome | 436 | 8.1 | −5.6 |
| UKIP | Nigel James | 137 | 2.5 | −4.0 |
| Majority | | 723 | 13.4 | −1.5 |
| Turnout | | 5,382 | 42.0 | −8.9 |
| Liberal Democrats hold | | Swing | | |

=== Gleadless Valley ===
Gleadless Valley
| Party | Candidate | Votes | % | ±% |
|---|---|---|---|---|
| Labour | Garry Weatherall* | 1,701 | 36.3 | +0.5 |
| Liberal Democrats | Denise Reaney | 1,652 | 35.3 | +10.2 |
| Green | Robert Unwin | 981 | 21.0 | +0.3 |
| Conservative | Amy Taylor | 348 | 7.4 | −3.3 |
| Majority | | 49 | 1.0 | −6.1 |
| Turnout | | 4,682 | 35.1 | −9.4 |
| Labour hold | | Swing | | |

=== Graves Park ===
Graves Park
| Party | Candidate | Votes | % | ±% |
|---|---|---|---|---|
| Liberal Democrats | Robert McCann | 1,935 | 38.1 | +0.7 |
| Labour | Robert Pemberton | 1,389 | 27.4 | −0.7 |
| Conservative | Trevor Grant | 775 | 15.3 | −0.9 |
| Green | Rita Wilcock | 499 | 9.8 | −4.1 |
| UKIP | Pauline Arnott | 272 | 5.4 | N/A |
| Socialist Alternative | Celvin Payne | 206 | 4.1 | N/A |
| Majority | | 546 | 10.8 | +1.5 |
| Turnout | | 5,076 | 39.2 | −9.3 |
| Liberal Democrats hold | | Swing | | |

=== Hillsborough ===
Hillsborough
| Party | Candidate | Votes | % | ±% |
|---|---|---|---|---|
| Labour | Janet Bragg* | 1,882 | 41.4 | +0.2 |
| Liberal Democrats | Stephen Ayris | 1,667 | 36.6 | +1.7 |
| Green | Christopher McMahon | 568 | 12.5 | −2.2 |
| Conservative | Peter Smith | 433 | 9.5 | +0.8 |
| Majority | | 215 | 4.7 | −1.6 |
| Turnout | | 4,550 | 34.8 | −14.1 |
| Labour hold | | Swing | | |

=== Manor Castle ===
Manor Castle
| Party | Candidate | Votes | % | ±% |
|---|---|---|---|---|
| Labour | Janet Wilson* | 1,604 | 58.2 | +7.0 |
| Green | Graham Wroe | 473 | 17.2 | +3.2 |
| Liberal Democrats | Colin France | 363 | 13.2 | −1.4 |
| Conservative | Christina Stark | 316 | 11.5 | +2.6 |
| Majority | | 1,131 | 41.0 | +4.4 |
| Turnout | | 2,756 | 23.9 | −11.1 |
| Labour hold | | Swing | | |

=== Mosborough ===
Mosborough
| Party | Candidate | Votes | % | ±% |
|---|---|---|---|---|
| Labour | Samuel Wall* | 1,623 | 40.8 | +5.3 |
| Liberal Democrats | Christopher Tutt | 1,125 | 28.3 | +0.8 |
| Conservative | Evelyn Millward | 696 | 17.5 | −3.3 |
| UKIP | John Marshall | 308 | 7.7 | N/A |
| Green | Heather Hunt | 224 | 5.6 | −2.5 |
| Majority | | 498 | 12.5 | +4.5 |
| Turnout | | 3,976 | 30.6 | −11.0 |
| Labour hold | | Swing | | |

=== Nether Edge ===
Nether Edge
| Party | Candidate | Votes | % | ±% |
|---|---|---|---|---|
| Liberal Democrats | Patricia White* | 2,163 | 40.4 | +4.3 |
| Labour | Mohammad Khan | 1,743 | 32.5 | +5.0 |
| Green | Mervyn Smith | 986 | 18.4 | +0.7 |
| Conservative | Rosita Malandrinos | 466 | 8.7 | −3.0 |
| Majority | | 420 | 7.8 | −0.8 |
| Turnout | | 5,358 | 43.0 | −7.5 |
| Liberal Democrats hold | | Swing | | |

=== Richmond ===
Richmond
| Party | Candidate | Votes | % | ±% |
|---|---|---|---|---|
| Labour | Elizabeth Naylor | 1,832 | 48.1 | +4.9 |
| Liberal Democrats | Judith Webster | 741 | 19.5 | +3.8 |
| UKIP | Leslie Arnott | 508 | 13.3 | N/A |
| Conservative | Ian Fey | 438 | 11.5 | +0.1 |
| Green | Eamonn Ward | 289 | 7.6 | −6.3 |
| Majority | | 1091 | 28.7 | +1.8 |
| Turnout | | 3,808 | 29.8 | −11.8 |
| Labour hold | | Swing | | |

=== Shiregreen & Brightside ===
Shiregreen & Brightside
| Party | Candidate | Votes | % | ±% |
|---|---|---|---|---|
| Labour | Peter Rippon* | 1,883 | 48.5 | −0.6 |
| BNP | Christopher Hartigan | 1,015 | 26.1 | −2.2 |
| Liberal Democrats | Barbara Masters | 431 | 11.1 | −4.6 |
| Conservative | Mohammed Tariq | 317 | 8.2 | +0.6 |
| Green | Jennyfer Barnard | 239 | 6.2 | −3.6 |
| Majority | | 868 | 22.3 | +1.5 |
| Turnout | | 3,885 | 28.4 | +7.6 |
| Labour hold | | Swing | | |

=== Southey ===
Southey
| Party | Candidate | Votes | % | ±% |
|---|---|---|---|---|
| Labour | Gillian Furniss* | 1,602 | 46.1 | +0.5 |
| BNP | David Wright | 665 | 19.1 | −4.4 |
| Liberal Democrats | Richard Bowden | 377 | 10.8 | −2.2 |
| Conservative | Robert McIlveen | 350 | 10.1 | +1.3 |
| Independent | Mark Wilde | 337 | 9.7 | N/A |
| Green | Steven Barnard | 144 | 4.1 | −3.9 |
| Majority | | 937 | 27.0 | +4.9 |
| Turnout | | 3,475 | 27.0 | −9.4 |
| Labour hold | | Swing | | |

=== Stannington ===
Stannington
| Party | Candidate | Votes | % | ±% |
|---|---|---|---|---|
| Liberal Democrats | David Baker* | 2,421 | 46.9 | +11.2 |
| Labour | Louise Webb | 1,428 | 27.7 | −2.4 |
| Conservative | Matthew Dixon | 803 | 15.5 | −5.3 |
| Green | Michael Maas | 512 | 9.9 | −3.7 |
| Majority | | 993 | 19.2 | +13.6 |
| Turnout | | 5,164 | 37.9 | −10.4 |
| Liberal Democrats hold | | Swing | | |

=== Stocksbridge & Upper Don ===
Stocksbridge & Upper Don
| Party | Candidate | Votes | % | ±% |
|---|---|---|---|---|
| Liberal Democrats | Alison Brelsford* | 2,201 | 48.1 | +3.2 |
| Labour | Christopher Prescott | 1,094 | 23.9 | −3.8 |
| Conservative | Timothy Lewis | 736 | 16.1 | −0.6 |
| Green | Angela Roberts | 549 | 12.0 | −3.2 |
| Majority | | 1,107 | 24.2 | +7.0 |
| Turnout | | 4,580 | 32.2 | −9.6 |
| Liberal Democrats hold | | Swing | | |

=== Walkley ===
Walkley
| Party | Candidate | Votes | % | ±% |
|---|---|---|---|---|
| Liberal Democrats | Jonathan Harston* | 1,863 | 40.6 | +7.2 |
| Labour | James Bamford | 1,783 | 38.9 | +6.9 |
| Green | Barry New | 625 | 13.6 | −5.5 |
| Conservative | Andrew Gabbitas | 313 | 6.8 | −2.2 |
| Majority | | 80 | 1.7 | +0.3 |
| Turnout | | 4,584 | 35.5 | −7.6 |
| Liberal Democrats hold | | Swing | | |

=== West Ecclesfield ===
West Ecclesfield
| Party | Candidate | Votes | % | ±% |
|---|---|---|---|---|
| Liberal Democrats | Trevor Bagshaw* | 2,388 | 49.6 | +14.3 |
| Labour | Sheila Constance | 1,562 | 32.4 | −2.8 |
| Conservative | Paula Axelby | 511 | 10.6 | −2.9 |
| Green | Kathryn Aston | 353 | 7.3 | −1.9 |
| Majority | | 826 | 17.2 | +17.1 |
| Turnout | | 4,814 | 34.7 | −8.7 |
| Liberal Democrats hold | | Swing | | |

=== Woodhouse ===
Woodhouse
| Party | Candidate | Votes | % | ±% |
|---|---|---|---|---|
| Labour | Raymond Satur* | 1,966 | 49.6 | +6.7 |
| Liberal Democrats | Robert Moffett | 603 | 15.2 | +5.5 |
| UKIP | Jonathan Arnott | 574 | 14.5 | −3.4 |
| Conservative | Laurence Hayward | 546 | 13.8 | +4.1 |
| Green | Daniel Lyons | 278 | 7.0 | −0.3 |
| Majority | | 1,363 | 34.4 | +9.4 |
| Turnout | | 3,967 | 30.7 | −14.4 |
| Labour hold | | Swing | | |
