= 2010 Sheffield City Council election =

← 2008	6 May 2010	2011 →

One third of seats (28 of 84) to Sheffield City Council 43 seats needed for a majority
	First party	Second party
Party	Labour	Liberal Democrats
Seats won	16	12
Seat change	▲3	▼2
	Third party	Fourth party
Party	Green	Ind. Lib Dem
Seats won	0	0
Seat change	▼1	0
- Map showing the results of the 2010 Sheffield City Council elections.
Majority party before election
Liberal Democrats
Majority party after election
No Overall Control

Sheffield City Council elections took place on Thursday 6 May 2010. There were 28 seats up for election in 2010, one of the three councillors from each ward. Since the previous election, Liberal Democrat councillor Frank Taylor had defected to an Independent leaving the Liberal Democrats with 44 councillors. Turnout was up dramatically with it being held alongside the general election, to 62.6%. The higher turnout helped mainly Labour against their electoral rivals, who managed to return the council to no overall control with three gains. This was bolstered by the newly elected Liberal Democrat in Walkley defecting to Labour immediately after being elected.

== Election result ==
Sheffield City Council Election Result 2010
Party	Seats	Gains	Losses	Net gain/loss	Seats %	Votes %	Votes	+/−
Liberal Democrats	12	0	1	-1	42.8	36.2	87,078	-0.7
Labour	16	2	0	+2	57.1	35.6	85,652	+5.6
Conservative	0	0	0	0	0.0	14.6	35,138	-1.4
Green	0	0	1	-1	0.0	6.3	15,172	-2.8
BNP	0	0	0	0	0.0	3.8	9,095	-0.2
UKIP	0	0	0	0	0.0	2.8	6,766	+1.2
TUSC	0	0	0	0	0.0	0.4	865	N/A
English Democrat	0	0	0	0	0.0	0.3	748	N/A
Independent	0	0	0	0	0.0	0.1	173	-1.2
Socialist Alternative	0	0	0	0	0.0	0.1	128	-0.1

The Labour Party gained two seats from their position following the 2006 election, but also regained a seat lost to the Liberal Democrats through a double vacancy election in Mosborough.

This result had the following consequences for the total number of seats on the council after the elections:

Party	Previous council	New council	+/-
Liberal Democrats	44	42	▼2
Labour	36	39	▲3
Greens	3	2	▼1
Independent Liberal Democrat	1	1	0
Total	84	84	
Working majority	2	0	

== Ward results ==
=== Arbourthorne ===
Arbourthorne
Party	Candidate	Votes	%	±%
Labour	Jack Scott	3,247	47.1	+5.6
Liberal Democrats	Jayne Dore	1,888	27.4	−0.9
Conservative	Peter Smith	826	12.0	−6.8
BNP	Joanne Thomas	682	9.9	N/A
Green	Jennyfer Barnard	242	3.5	−8.0
Majority		1,359	19.7	+6.5
Turnout		6,885	54.9	+22.9
Labour hold		Swing		

=== Beauchief & Greenhill ===
Beauchief & Greenhill
Party	Candidate	Votes	%	±%
Liberal Democrats	Clive Anthony Skelton*	3,626	43.8	+4.2
Labour	Ajaz Ahmed	2,622	31.6	+4.2
Conservative	Michelle Grant	1,015	12.3	−5.5
BNP	John Winston Beatson	689	8.3	−1.6
Green	Christina Hespe	333	4.0	−1.2
Majority		1,004	12.1	−0.1
Turnout		8285	61.0	+22.0
Liberal Democrats hold		Swing		

=== Beighton ===
Beighton
Party	Candidate	Votes	%	±%
Labour	Helen Mirfin-Boukouris*	3,650	44.2	+1.3
Liberal Democrats	Robbie Cowbury	1,988	24.1	+5.6
Conservative	Shirley Diane Clayton	1,606	19.4	−11.2
BNP	Matthew Joseph Gouldsbrough	525	6.3	N/A
UKIP	Wayne Anthony Harling	259	3.1	N/A
Green	Andrew Julian Brandram	229	2.8	−5.1
Majority		1.662	20.1	+7.8
Turnout		8,257	63.0	+32.0
Labour hold		Swing		

=== Birley ===
Birley
Party	Candidate	Votes	%	±%
Labour	Karen Lesley McGowan	3,790	45.0	−3.1
Liberal Democrats	Diana Stimely	1,778	21.1	−0.7
Conservative	Gordon Ronald Millward	1,063	12.6	−7.4
Green	Frank Plunkett	821	9.7	−0.4
BNP	Michael Smith	597	7.1	N/A
UKIP	Graham Cheetham	372	4.4	N/A
Majority		2,012	23.9	−2.3
Turnout		8,421	65.5	+31.1
Labour hold		Swing		

=== Broomhill ===
Broomhill
Party	Candidate	Votes	%	±%
Liberal Democrats	Shaffaq Mohammed*	3,734	46.6	−0.1
Labour	Mohammed Akbar	1,798	22.4	+8.3
Green	Bernard James Little**	1,389	17.3	−9.3
Conservative	Michael Lawrence Ginn	938	11.7	−0.9
UKIP	Pat Sullivan	155	1.9	N/A
Majority		1,936	24.2	+4.1
Turnout		8,014	58.5	+34.0
Liberal Democrats hold		Swing		

Bernard Little was a sitting councillor for Central ward.

=== Burngreave ===
Burngreave
Party	Candidate	Votes	%	±%
Labour	Talib Hussain	4,892	57.9	+7.4
Liberal Democrats	Mubarak Ismail	1,300	15.4	N/A
TUSC	Maxine Bowler	865	10.2	−13.0
Conservative	Russell Craig Cutts	801	9.5	−3.1
Green	Christopher John Sissons	590	7.0	−6.6
Majority		3,592	42.5	+15.2
Turnout		8,448	55.0	+23.0
Labour hold		Swing		

=== Central ===
Central
Party	Candidate	Votes	%	±%
Labour	Mohammed Maroof	2,879	33.3	−5.7
Liberal Democrats	Mohammad Azim	2,775	32.1	+19.1
Green	Rob Unwin	2,192	25.4	−14.8
Conservative	Jane Beryl Ledbury	793	9.2	+1.4
Majority		104	1.2	N/A
Turnout		8,639	48.0	+17.0
Labour gain from Green		Swing		

=== Crookes ===
Crookes
Party	Candidate	Votes	%	±%
Liberal Democrats	Sylvia Anginotti*	5,210	52.0	−0.9
Labour	Geoff Smith	2,063	20.6	+7.8
Conservative	Matt Dixon	1,708	17.0	−3.6
Green	Julian Rupert Crossland Briggs	1,028	10.3	−3.4
Majority		3,147	31.4	−1.0
Turnout		10,009	73.0	+35.0
Liberal Democrats hold		Swing		

=== Darnall ===
Darnall
Party	Candidate	Votes	%	±%
Labour	Mazher Iqbal*	4,179	49.8	+5.5
Liberal Democrats	Misbah Uz Chowdhury	2,390	28.5	−3.7
UKIP	Charlotte Elizabeth Arnott	880	10.5	+1.5
Conservative	Margaret Elizabeth Pigott	676	8.0	−1.5
Green	Julie Anne White	258	3.1	−1.9
Majority		1,789	21.2	+9.1
Turnout		8,383	57.0	+23.0
Labour hold		Swing		

=== Dore & Totley ===
Dore & Totley
Party	Candidate	Votes	%	±%
Liberal Democrats	Keith Leonard Hill*	5,207	50.5	+1.9
Conservative	David Alan Pinder	3,444	33.4	−10.2
Labour	Basheer Khan	906	8.8	+5.1
English Democrat	Peter Smith	417	4.0	N/A
Green	Rita Louise Wilcock	326	3.1	+0.6
Majority		1,763	17.1	+12.0
Turnout		10,300	77.0	+20.9
Liberal Democrats hold		Swing		

=== East Ecclesfield ===
East Ecclesfield
Party	Candidate	Votes	%	±%
Labour	Garry David Weatherall**	3,500	37.5	+7.3
Liberal Democrats	Howard Banner House	3,450	36.9	−6.1
Conservative	Russell Scott Marsh-Smith	1,288	13.8	+3.0
BNP	Leanne Keen	892	9.5	−3.1
Green	Mia Safir	206	2.2	−1.2
Majority		50	0.6	N/A
Turnout		9,336	66.0	+27.6
Labour gain from Liberal Democrats		Swing		

Garry Weatherall was a sitting councillor for Gleadless Valley ward.

=== Ecclesall ===
Ecclesall
Party	Candidate	Votes	%	±%
Liberal Democrats	Roger Davison*	6,280	57.7	−0.5
Conservative	Daniel Riddington-Young	2,050	18.8	−5.6
Labour	Mohammad Nazir	1,434	13.2	+5.1
Green	Arun Mathur	815	7.5	−1.7
UKIP	Jason Christopher Sullivan	300	2.7	N/A
Majority		4,230	38.9	+5.0
Turnout		10,879	73.9	+26.9
Liberal Democrats hold		Swing		

=== Firth Park ===
Firth Park
Party	Candidate	Votes	%	±%
Labour	Alan Law*	3,917	56.7	+9.2
Liberal Democrats	Mansha Khan	1,094	15.8	+1.5
BNP	Jordan Michael Pont	866	12.5	−7.0
Conservative	Martin John Brannan	794	11.5	+1.6
Green	Leela Simms	236	3.4	−3.3
Majority		2,823	40.9	+15.4
Turnout		6,907	52.0	+22.0
Labour hold		Swing		

=== Fulwood ===
Fulwood
Party	Candidate	Votes	%	±%
Liberal Democrats	Janice Margaret Sidebottom*	5,217	54.6	−0.3
Conservative	Alan Ryder	2,270	23.8	−3.4
Labour	Tim Jeffery	1,196	12.5	+4.3
Green	Judith Rutnam	638	6.7	−0.4
UKIP	Nigel Terence James	225	2.3	−0.3
Majority		2,947	30.8	+3.1
Turnout		9,546	68.0	+24.0
Liberal Democrats hold		Swing		

=== Gleadless Valley ===
Gleadless Valley
Party	Candidate	Votes	%	±%
Labour	Cate McDonald	3,394	40.6	+5.5
Liberal Democrats	Andy Hinman	2,795	33.4	−8.7
Green	Gareth Edward John Roberts	847	10.1	−5.0
Conservative	Jenny Grant	732	8.7	+1.0
UKIP	Jennifer Marie Ruchat	394	4.7	N/A
Independent	Bina Mistry	116	1.4	N/A
Socialist Alternative	Michael Barry Bartholomew	84	1.0	N/A
Majority		599	7.2	N/A
Turnout		8,362	60.2	+21.2
Labour hold		Swing		

=== Graves Park ===
Graves Park
Party	Candidate	Votes	%	±%
Liberal Democrats	Bob McCann*	4,080	43.8	−3.3
Labour	Bob Pemberton	2,824	30.3	+9.6
Conservative	Trevor Grant	1,643	17.6	+1.1
Green	David Maurice Hayes	383	4.1	−2.4
UKIP	Pauline Elizabeth Arnott	289	3.1	−1.1
Independent	Marie Anne Busfield	57	0.6	N/A
Socialist Alternative	Alan Thornton Munro	44	0.5	−4.6
Majority		1,256	13.5	−13.0
Turnout		9,320	70.0	+29.0
Liberal Democrats hold		Swing		

=== Hillsborough ===
Hillsborough
Party	Candidate	Votes	%	±%
Labour	Janet Pleasance Bragg*	3,480	38.6	+9.1
Liberal Democrats	Karen Southwood	3,454	38.3	−11.6
Conservative	Paul Anthony Wallace	1,000	11.1	+5.8
BNP	Tracey Smith	647	7.2	−1.7
Green	Chris McMahon	435	4.8	−1.5
Majority		26	0.3	N/A
Turnout		9,016	66.0	+24.2
Labour hold		Swing		

=== Manor Castle ===
Manor Castle
Party	Candidate	Votes	%	±%
Labour	Jan Wilson*	3,371	55.4	+2.5
Liberal Democrats	Dave Croft	1,552	25.5	+3.1
BNP	Benjamin Francis Thomas	465	7.6	N/A
Conservative	Christina Alison Stark	438	7.2	−5.9
Green	Graham Stephen Wroe	260	4.3	−7.3
Majority		1,819	29.9	−0.6
Turnout		6,086	52.0	+24.7
Labour hold		Swing		

=== Mosborough ===
Mosborough
Party	Candidate	Votes	%	±%
Labour	Isobel Mary Wilson Bowler	3,270	37.6	+3.2
Liberal Democrats	Elaine Hinman	3,013	34.6	−7.3
Conservative	Eve Millward	1,506	17.3	+1.8
BNP	Terence William Craine	473	5.4	N/A
UKIP	Les Asnott	307	3.5	N/A
Green	Anwen Fryer	126	1.4	−4.6
Majority		257	3.0	N/A
Turnout		8,695	64.0	+26.3
Labour hold		Swing		

Mosborough was a regain for the Labour Party, after the Liberal Democrats had won a double vacancy election in 2008.

=== Nether Edge ===
Nether Edge
Party	Candidate	Votes	%	±%
Liberal Democrats	Anders Paul Hanson	4,545	47.2	+2.6
Labour	Tim Rippon**	3,075	31.9	−4.4
Green	Gemma Lock	1,042	10.8	−2.3
Conservative	Rosita Beryl Malandrinos	793	8.2	+2.2
UKIP	Jeffrey Stephen Shaw	172	1.8	N/A
Majority		1,470	15.3	+7.0
Turnout		9,629	73.8	+26.8
Liberal Democrats hold		Swing		

Tim Rippon was a sitting councillor for Arbourthorne ward.

=== Richmond ===
Richmond
Party	Candidate	Votes	%	±%
Labour	Martin Lawton	3,624	49.2	+6.4
Liberal Democrats	Genna Howells	1,631	22.1	+2.5
Conservative	Ian Fey	907	12.3	−3.3
BNP	Christopher Neil Hartigan	641	8.7	N/A
UKIP	David John Asher	402	5.5	−10.1
Green	Richard Anthony Roper	158	2.1	−9.0
Majority		1,993	27.1	+2.9
Turnout		7,363	57.0	+26.0
Labour hold		Swing		

=== Shiregreen & Brightside ===
Shiregreen & Brightside
Party	Candidate	Votes	%	±%
Labour	Peter Rippon*	3,608	49.6	+5.5
Liberal Democrats	Jim Tosseano	1,275	17.5	+8.7
BNP	Brian Thwaites	987	13.6	−7.7
Conservative	Eric Kirby	799	11.0	−0.3
UKIP	Scott Andrew Wright	401	5.5	N/A
Green	Steve Michael Brady	203	2.8	−2.9
Majority		2,333	32.1	+9.2
Turnout		7,273	54.0	+24.0
Labour hold		Swing		

=== Southey ===
Southey
Party	Candidate	Votes	%	±%
Labour	Gillian Furniss*	3,676	52.8	+10.9
Liberal Democrats	Chris Tosseano	1,329	19.1	+1.4
BNP	John Sheldon	990	14.2	−11.3
Conservative	Jill Hallam	775	11.1	+0.3
Green	Charles Eamonn Ward	194	2.8	−1.2
Majority		2,347	33.7	+17.3
Turnout		6,964	52.0	+21.3
Labour hold		Swing		

=== Stannington ===
Stannington
Party	Candidate	Votes	%	±%
Liberal Democrats	David Baker*	4,620	46.9	+0.2
Labour	Qurban Hussain	2,286	23.2	+0.6
Conservative	Andrew John Watson	1,756	17.8	+2.6
BNP	Malcolm Thomas Woodhead	641	6.5	−2.9
Green	Martin Keith Bradshaw	552	5.6	−0.4
Majority		2,334	23.7	−0.4
Turnout		9,855	69.7	+28.7
Liberal Democrats hold		Swing		

=== Stocksbridge & Upper Don ===
Stocksbridge & Upper Don
Party	Candidate	Votes	%	±%
Liberal Democrats	Alison Elaine Brelsford*	3,360	34.5	−4.5
Labour	Philip Wood	2,657	27.2	+13.8
Conservative	Hilary Ann Gay	1,972	20.2	+1.6
UKIP	Grant French	1,466	15.0	N/A
Green	Dan Lyons	290	3.0	−2.6
Majority		703	7.3	−8.0
Turnout		9,745	68.0	+27.3
Liberal Democrats hold		Swing		

=== Walkley ===
Walkley
Party	Candidate	Votes	%	±%
Liberal Democrats	Ben Curran	3,760	41.0	−8.6
Labour	Catherine Anne Walsh	3,470	37.8	+2.6
Green	Jim Wilson	794	8.6	−1.4
Conservative	George Roy Ledbury	747	8.1	+2.9
UKIP	Richard John Ratcliffe	405	4.4	N/A
Majority		290	3.2	−11.2
Turnout		9,176	63.7	+23.7
Liberal Democrats hold		Swing		

=== West Ecclesfield ===
West Ecclesfield
Party	Candidate	Votes	%	±%
Liberal Democrats	Trevor Bagshaw*	4,034	43.4	−9.0
Labour	Alf Meade	3,211	34.5	+13.0
Conservative	Tim Lewis	1,680	18.0	+7.5
Green	Kathy Aston	375	4.0	+0.3
Majority		823	8.0	−23.0
Turnout		9,300	66.0	+28.6
Liberal Democrats hold		Swing		

=== Woodhouse ===
Woodhouse
Party	Candidate	Votes	%	±%
Labour	Raymond Michael Satur*	3,633	47.0	−0.6
Liberal Democrats	Christopher Andrew Bingham	1,693	21.9	+6.5
Conservative	Laurence George Eyes Hayward	1,118	14.5	−1.8
UKIP	Jonathan Arnott	739	9.5	−4.3
English Democrat	Derek Anthony Hutchinson	331	4.3	N/A
Green	John Francis Grant	210	2.7	−4.1
Majority		1,940	25.1	−6.2
Turnout		7,724	57.0	+24.0
Labour hold		Swing		

== By-elections between 2010 and 2011 ==
Woodhouse By-Election 26 August 2010
Party	Candidate	Votes	%	±%
Labour	Jackie Satur	1,855	52.4	+5.4
Liberal Democrats	Joe Otten	757	21.4	−0.5
UKIP	Jonathan Arnott	491	13.9	+4.4
Conservative	Lawrence Hayward	154	4.3	−10.2
BNP	Jordan Pont	143	4.0	N/A
Green	John Grant	83	2.3	−0.4
Independent	Derek Hutchinson	58	1.6	N/A
Majority		1,098	31.0	+5.9
Turnout		3,541	26.4	−30.6
Labour hold		Swing	+2.9	

Manor Castle By-Election 21 October 2010
Party	Candidate	Votes	%	±%
Labour	Terry Fox	2,092	75.8	+20.4
Liberal Democrats	Robbie Cowbury	303	11.0	−14.5
Green	Graham Stephen Wroe	224	8.1	+3.8
Conservative	Christina Stark	142	5.1	−2.1
Majority		1,789	64.8	+34.9
Turnout		2,761	22.4	−29.6
Labour hold		Swing	+17.4	
