= 2011 Sheffield City Council election =

← 2010	5 May 2011	2012 →

One third of seats (28 of 84) to Sheffield City Council 43 seats needed for a majority
	First party	Second party
Party	Labour	Liberal Democrats
Seats won	21	6
Seat change	▲9	▼9
	Third party	Fourth party
Party	Green	Conservative
Seats won	1	0
Seat change	0	0
- Map showing the results of the 2011 Sheffield City Council elections.
Majority party before election
No overall control
Majority party after election
Labour

Sheffield City Council elections took place on 5 May 2011. There were 28 seats up for election, one third of the council. The last election left the council with no overall control. Since the previous election, Liberal Democrat councillor Ben Curran, and Lib Dem-turned-independent Frank Taylor had defected to Labour leaving both parties equal at 41 councillors each. This election saw Labour regain control of the council that they lost in 2006, with nine gains from the Lib Dems. Overall turnout was 41.8%.

Councillors elected in 2007 Sheffield Council election defended their seats this year.

== Election result ==
Sheffield City Council election result 2011
Party	Seats	Gains	Losses	Net gain/loss	Seats %	Votes %	Votes	+/−
Labour	21	9	0	+9	75.0	47.9	78,147	+12.3
Liberal Democrats	6	0	9	-9	21.4	25.9	42,305	-10.3
Conservative	0	0	0	0	0.0	11.7	19,016	-2.9
Green	1	0	0	0	3.6	11.2	18,322	+4.9
UKIP	0	0	0	0	0.0	1.8	2,914	-1.0
TUSC	0	0	0	0	0.0	0.8	1,266	+0.4
BNP	0	0	0	0	0.0	0.4	647	-3.4
Independent	0	0	0	0	0.0	0.2	300	+0.1
Socialist Equality	0	0	0	0	0.0	0.1	116	N/A

This result had the following consequences for the total number of seats on the Council after the elections:

Party	Previous council	New council	+/-
Labour	41	50	▲9
Liberal Democrats	41	32	▼9
Greens	2	2	Steady
Total	84	84	
Working majority	0	16	

== Ward results ==
=== Arbourthorne ===
Arbourthorne
Party	Candidate	Votes	%	±%
Labour	John Robson*	2,938	58.9	+11.8
Green	Jennyfer Marie Andrea Barnard	965	19.3	+15.8
Liberal Democrats	Chris Tutt	566	11.3	−16.1
Conservative	Peter Smith	517	10.3	−1.7
Majority		1,973	39.6	+19.9
Turnout		4,986	39.3	−15.6
Labour hold		Swing		

=== Beauchief and Greenhill ===
Beauchief and Greenhill
Party	Candidate	Votes	%	±%
Liberal Democrats	Simon William Clement-Jones*	2,496	40.8	−3.0
Labour	Ajaz Ahmed	2,121	34.7	+3.1
Conservative	Michelle Grant	566	9.2	−3.1
Green	Christina Hespe	317	5.2	+1.2
UKIP	Bob Sheridan	266	4.3	N/A
BNP	John Winston Beatson	262	4.3	−4.0
Independent	Martin Brighton	81	1.3	N/A
Majority		375	6.1	−6.0
Turnout		6,109	45.1	−15.9
Liberal Democrats hold		Swing		

=== Beighton ===
Beighton
Party	Candidate	Votes	%	±%
Labour	Chris Rosling-Josephs*	2,986	61.2	+17.0
Conservative	Shirley Diane Clayton	991	20.3	+0.9
Liberal Democrats	Andy Hinman	570	11.7	−12.4
Green	Julian Brandram	333	6.8	+4.0
Majority		1,995	40.9	+20.8
Turnout		4880	37.0	−26.0
Labour hold		Swing		

=== Birley ===
Birley
Party	Candidate	Votes	%	±%
Labour	Denise Fox*	3,250	65.7	+20.7
Conservative	Susan Elizabeth Hayward	683	13.8	+1.2
Liberal Democrats	Barrie William Jervis	514	10.4	−10.7
Green	Frank Plunkett	500	10.1	+0.4
Majority		2,567	51.9	+28.0
Turnout		4,947	38.5	−27.0
Labour hold		Swing		

=== Broomhill ===
Broomhill
Party	Candidate	Votes	%	±%
Labour	Stuart Ian Wattam	1,741	34.6	+12.2
Liberal Democrats	Alan Edward Whitehouse*	1,371	27.2	−19.4
Green	Bernard James Little	1,315	26.1	+8.8
Conservative	Michael Lawrence Ginn	505	10.0	−1.7
UKIP	Pat Sullivan	104	2.0	+0.1
Majority		370	7.4	−16.8
Turnout		5,036	37.8	−20.7
Labour gain from Liberal Democrats		Swing		

=== Burngreave ===
Burngreave
Party	Candidate	Votes	%	±%
Labour	Ibrar Hussain*	3,982	67.3	+9.4
TUSC	Maxine Bowler	831	14.0	+3.8
Green	Christopher John Sissons	447	7.5	+0.5
Conservative	Russell Craig Cutts	408	6.9	−2.6
Liberal Democrats	Javid Khan	250	4.2	−11.2
Majority		3,151	53.3	+10.8
Turnout		5,918	38.5	−16.5
Labour hold		Swing		

=== Central ===
Central
Party	Candidate	Votes	%	±%
Green	Jillian Creasy*	2,530	42.9	+17.5
Labour	Mohammed Akbar	2,337	39.6	+6.3
Liberal Democrats	Iltaf Hussain	631	10.7	−21.4
Conservative	Emma Waters	403	6.8	−2.4
Majority		293	5.1	N/A
Turnout		5,801	31.0	−17.0
Green hold		Swing		

=== Crookes ===
Crookes
Party	Candidate	Votes	%	±%
Labour	Geoff Smith	2,916	39.6	+19.0
Liberal Democrats	John Hesketh*	2,397	32.5	−19.5
Green	Julian Rupert Crossland Briggs	1,174	15.9	+5.6
Conservative	John Derwent Swift Levick	874	11.9	−5.1
Majority		519	7.1	N/A
Turnout		7,361	52.8	−20.2
Labour gain from Liberal Democrats		Swing		

=== Darnall ===
Darnall
Party	Candidate	Votes	%	±%
Labour	Harry Harpham*	3,706	69.0	+19.2
Liberal Democrats	Tasadique Mohammed	522	9.7	−18.8
UKIP	Charlotte Elizabeth Arnott	510	9.5	−1.0
Conservative	Ian Randolph Hiller	328	6.1	−1.9
Green	Adrian John Hawley	303	5.6	+2.5
Majority		3,184	59.3	+38.1
Turnout		5,369	35.6	−21.4
Labour hold		Swing		

=== Dore and Totley ===
Dore and Totley
Party	Candidate	Votes	%	±%
Liberal Democrats	Joseph Otten	3,248	42.9	−7.6
Conservative	Daniel Kevin Gage	2,419	32.0	−1.4
Labour	Jen Henderson	1,368	18.1	+9.3
Green	Rita Louise Wilcock	530	7.0	+3.9
Majority		829	10.9	−6.2
Turnout		7,565	56.2	−20.8
Liberal Democrats hold		Swing		

=== East Ecclesfield ===
East Ecclesfield
Party	Candidate	Votes	%	±%
Labour	Steven Wilson	2,926	47.1	+9.6
Liberal Democrats	Victoria Margaret Bowden*	2,150	34.6	−2.3
Conservative	Russell Marsh-Smith	421	6.8	−7.0
BNP	Jordan Michael Pont	385	6.2	−3.3
Green	Kaye Horsfield	333	5.3	+3.1
Majority		776	12.5	+11.9
Turnout		6,215	43.2	−22.8
Labour gain from Liberal Democrats		Swing		

=== Ecclesall ===
Ecclesall
Party	Candidate	Votes	%	±%
Liberal Democrats	Diana Stimely	3,390	40.7	−17.0
Labour	Neale Gibson-Abo-Anber	2,160	25.9	+12.7
Conservative	Christina Alison Stark	1,587	19.0	+0.2
Green	Arun Mathur	1,187	14.2	+6.7
Majority		1,230	14.8	−24.1
Turnout		8,324	56.5	−17.4
Liberal Democrats hold		Swing		

=== Firth Park ===
Firth Park
Party	Candidate	Votes	%	±%
Labour	Christopher Weldon*	3,331	75.1	+18.4
Conservative	Judith Ross Burkinshaw	402	9.0	−2.5
Green	Leela Simms	367	8.3	+4.9
Liberal Democrats	Jonathan Graham Harston	334	7.5	−8.3
Majority		2,929	66.1	+25.2
Turnout		4,434	32.5	−19.5
Labour hold		Swing		

=== Fulwood ===
Fulwood
Party	Candidate	Votes	%	±%
Liberal Democrats	Andrew Paul Sangar*	3,095	40.0	−14.6
Labour	Catherine Anne Walsh	1,880	24.3	+11.8
Conservative	Alan Ryder	1,646	21.2	−2.6
Green	Judith Fiona Rutnam	1,121	14.5	+7.8
Majority		1,215	15.7	−15.1
Turnout		7,742	54.1	−13.9
Liberal Democrats hold		Swing		

=== Gleadless Valley ===
Gleadless Valley
Party	Candidate	Votes	%	±%
Labour	Tim Rippon	3,187	51.3	+10.7
Liberal Democrats	Denise Ann Reaney*	1,845	29.7	−3.7
Green	Steve Barnard	703	11.3	+1.2
Conservative	Jenny Grant	290	4.6	−4.1
TUSC	Alan Thorton Munro	186	3.0	+2.0
Majority		1,342	21.6	+14.4
Turnout		6,211	44.3	−15.9
Labour gain from Liberal Democrats		Swing		

=== Graves Park ===
Graves Park
Party	Candidate	Votes	%	±%
Liberal Democrats	Ian Auckland*	2,621	40.6	−3.2
Labour	Bob Pemberton	2,485	38.5	+8.2
Conservative	Trevor Grant	895	13.8	−3.8
Green	David Maurice Hayes	308	4.8	+0.7
TUSC	Keith Raymond Endean	147	2.3	+1.8
Majority		136	2.1	−11.4
Turnout		6,456	48.2	−21.8
Liberal Democrats hold		Swing		

=== Hillsborough ===
Hillsborough
Party	Candidate	Votes	%	±%
Labour	Bob Johnson	3,312	54.5	+15.9
Liberal Democrats	Steve Ayris*	1,765	29.1	−9.2
Green	Chris McMahon	586	9.6	+4.8
Conservative	Steven Antony Lawton	411	6.8	−4.3
Majority		1,547	25.5	+25.2
Turnout		6,074	44.6	−21.4
Labour gain from Liberal Democrats		Swing		

=== Manor Castle ===
Manor Castle
Party	Candidate	Votes	%	±%
Labour	Jenny Armstrong*	2,732	73.0	+17.6
Green	Graham Stephen Wroe	420	11.2	+6.9
Liberal Democrats	Katie Condliffe	340	9.1	−16.4
Conservative	Miles David Anthony Waters	253	6.8	−0.4
Majority		2,312	61.7	+31.8
Turnout		3,745	30.1	−21.9
Labour hold		Swing		

=== Mosborough ===
Mosborough
Party	Candidate	Votes	%	±%
Labour	David Charles Barker*	3,069	54.0	+16.4
Liberal Democrats	Elaine Hinman	1,762	31.0	−3.6
Conservative	Gabrielle Pitfield	608	10.7	−6.6
Green	Anwen Fryer	248	4.4	+3.0
Majority		1,307	23.0	+20.0
Turnout		5,687	41.9	−22.1
Labour hold		Swing		

=== Nether Edge ===
Nether Edge
Party	Candidate	Votes	%	±%
Labour	Qurban Hussain	3,160	44.1	+12.2
Liberal Democrats	Jayne Dore	2,175	30.3	−16.9
Green	Rob Cole	1,105	15.4	+4.6
Conservative	Roz Malandrinos	363	5.1	−3.1
Independent	Richard Brian Ward	219	3.1	N/A
UKIP	Jeffrey Stephen Shaw	145	2.0	+0.2
Majority		985	13.7	N/A
Turnout		7,167	53.5	−20.3
Labour gain from Liberal Democrats		Swing		

=== Richmond ===
Richmond
Party	Candidate	Votes	%	±%
Labour	John Campbell*	3,070	67.0	+17.8
Conservative	Andrew James Sneddon	517	11.3	−1.0
Green	Richard Anthony Roper	508	11.1	+9.0
Liberal Democrats	Barbara Wieslawa Masters	487	10.6	−11.5
Majority		2,553	55.7	+28.6
Turnout		4,582	35.0	−22.0
Labour hold		Swing		

=== Shiregreen and Brightside ===
Shiregreen and Brightside
Party	Candidate	Votes	%	±%
Labour	Peter Price*	3,097	71.2	+21.6
Conservative	Eric Kirby	463	10.6	−0.4
Green	Steve Michael Brady	451	10.4	+7.6
Liberal Democrats	James Tosseano	338	7.8	−9.7
Majority		2,629	60.5	+28.4
Turnout		4,344	31.4	−22.6
Labour hold		Swing		

=== Southey ===
Southey
Party	Candidate	Votes	%	±%
Labour	Leigh Michael Bramall*	2,927	72.4	+19.6
Liberal Democrats	Christine Tosseano	403	10.0	−9.1
Conservative	James Edward Gould	365	9.0	−2.1
Green	Eamonn Charles Ward	347	8.6	+5.8
Majority		2,524	62.4	+28.7
Turnout		4,042	30.0	−22.0
Labour hold		Swing		

=== Stannington ===
Stannington
Party	Candidate	Votes	%	±%
Liberal Democrats	Vickie Priestley*	2,540	38.9	−8.0
Labour	Max Telfer	2,535	38.8	+15.6
Conservative	Nigel Stuart Bonson	856	13.1	−4.7
Green	Mike Maas	602	9.2	+3.6
Majority		5	0.1	−23.6
Turnout		6,533	46.2	−23.5
Liberal Democrats hold		Swing		

=== Stocksbridge and Upper Don ===
Stocksbridge and Upper Don
Party	Candidate	Votes	%	±%
Labour	Philip Wood	2,321	37.0	+9.8
Liberal Democrats	Martin Charles Brelsford*	1,790	28.5	−6.0
UKIP	Grant Antony French	950	15.1	+0.1
Conservative	Nigel John Owen	868	13.8	−6.4
Green	Dan Lyons	352	5.6	+2.6
Majority		531	8.5	N/A
Turnout		6,281	43.3	−24.7
Labour gain from Liberal Democrats		Swing		

=== Walkley ===
Walkley
Party	Candidate	Votes	%	±%
Labour	Nikki Sharpe	3,056	47.2	+9.4
Liberal Democrats	Penny Baker*	1,892	29.2	−11.8
Green	Jim Wilson	727	11.2	+2.6
UKIP	Richard John Ratcliffe	301	4.7	+0.3
Conservative	Kirsten Hurrell	275	4.3	−3.8
Socialist Equality	Simon Peter Walker	116	1.8	N/A
TUSC	Chaz Lockett	102	1.6	N/A
Majority		1,164	18.0	N/A
Turnout		6,469	31.2	−32.5
Labour gain from Liberal Democrats		Swing		

=== West Ecclesfield ===
West Ecclesfield
Party	Candidate	Votes	%	±%
Labour	Alf Meade	2,497	43.1	+8.6
Liberal Democrats	Alan Hooper*	2,308	39.9	−3.5
Conservative	Hilary Ann Gay	620	10.7	−7.3
Green	Kathy Aston	366	6.3	+2.3
Majority		189	3.3	N/A
Turnout		5,791	41.4	−24.6
Labour gain from Liberal Democrats		Swing		

=== Woodhouse ===
Woodhouse
Party	Candidate	Votes	%	±%
Labour	Mick Rooney*	3,057	62.9	+15.9
UKIP	Jonathan Arnott	638	13.1	+3.6
Liberal Democrats	Les Abrahams	505	10.4	−11.5
Conservative	Laurence George Eyes Hayward	482	9.9	−4.6
Green	John Francis Grant	177	3.6	+0.9
Majority		2,419	49.8	−7.2
Turnout		4,859	36.6	+11.5
Labour hold		Swing		
