= 2007 Sheffield City Council election =

← 2006	3 May 2007	2008 →

One third of seats (28 of 84) to Sheffield City Council 43 seats needed for a majority
	First party	Second party
Party	Liberal Democrats	Labour
Seats won	15	12
Seat change	▲4	▼3
	Third party	Fourth party
Party	Green	Conservative
Seats won	1	0
Seat change	0	▼1
- Map showing the results of the 2007 Sheffield City Council elections.
Majority party before election
Labour
Majority party after election
No Overall Control

Sheffield City Council elections took place on Thursday 3 May 2007 with one third of council seats up for election; one in each ward. Since the previous election, Liberal Democrat Martin Davis (representing Stocksbridge & Upper Don) defected, sitting as an independent. This set of elections saw the Conservatives lose the only seat they had on the council since 1996, and the party did not have any councillors elected to Sheffield City Council until 2021.

The election seen several gains for the Liberal Democrats, returning the council to no overall control. Overall turnout was 36.0%, up slightly from last year's 34.5%.

== Councillors before and after the election ==
Ward	Incumbent Elected	Incumbent	Re-elected
Arbourthorne	2004	John Robson	John Robson
Beauchief & Greenhill	2004	Simon Clement-Jones	Simon Clement-Jones
Beighton	2004	Christopher Rosling-Josephs	Christopher Rosling-Josephs
Birley	2005 (by-election)	Denise Fox	Denise Fox
Broomhill	2004	Alan Whitehouse	Alan Whitehouse
Burngreave	2004	Ibrar Hussain	Ibrar Hussain
Central	2004	Jillian Creasy	Jillian Creasy
Crookes	2004	John Hesketh	John Hesketh
Darnall	2004	Harry Harpham	Harry Harpham
Dore and Totley	2004	Michael Waters	Michael Davis
East Ecclesfield	2004	Victoria Bowden	Victoria Bowden
Ecclesall	2006 (two vacancies)	Michael Reynolds	Michael Reynolds
Firth Park	2004	Christopher Weldon	Christopher Weldon
Fulwood	2004	Andrew Sangar	Andrew Sangar
Gleadless Valley	2004	Rosemary Telfer	Denise Reaney
Graves Park	2004	Ian Auckland	Ian Auckland
Hillsborough	2004	Alfred Meade	Stephen Ayris
Manor Castle	2004	Janet Fiore	Jenny Armstrong
Mosborough	2004	David Barker	David Barker
Nether Edge		Vacancy	Colin France
Richmond	2004	John Campbell	John Campbell
Shiregreen and Brightside	2004	Peter Price	Peter Price
Southey	2004	Leigh Bramall	Leigh Bramall
Stannington	2004	Vickie Priestley	Vickie Priestley
Stocksbridge and Upper Don	2004	Martin Brelsford	Martin Brelsford
Walkley	2004	Veronica Hardstaff	Penny Baker
West Ecclesfield	2004	Alan Hooper	Alan Hooper
Woodhouse	2004	Michael Rooney	Michael Rooney

== Election result ==
Sheffield City Council Election Result 2007
Party	Seats	Gains	Losses	Net gain/loss	Seats %	Votes %	Votes	+/−
Labour	12	0	3	-3	42.8	34.8	46,643	+1.1
Liberal Democrats	15	4	0	+4	53.6	33.9	45,449	-0.1
Conservative	0	0	1	-1	0.0	14.5	19,391	-0.5
Green	1	0	0	0	3.6	9.6	12,836	-1.3
BNP	0	0	0	0	0.0	3.3	4,474	+1.0
Respect	0	0	0	0	0.0	1.9	2,488	+0.9
UKIP	0	0	0	0	0.0	1.8	2,446	-0.5
Independent	0	0	0	0	0.0	0.2	234	N/A
Socialist Alternative	0	0	0	0	0.0	0.1	194	-0.1

This result had the following consequences for the total number of seats on the council after the elections:

Party	Previous council	New council
Labour	44	41
Liberal Democrats	35	39
Green	2	2
Conservatives	2	1
Independent Liberal Democrat	1	1
Total	84	84
Working majority	4	-2

== Ward results ==
=== Arbourthorne ===
Arbourthorne
Party	Candidate	Votes	%	±%
Labour	John Robson*	2,099	55.8	+6.3
Liberal Democrats	Tony Bennett	830	22.1	−3.3
Conservative	Peter Smith	527	14.0	+0.8
Green	Krystyna Haywood	304	8.1	−0.3
Majority		1,269	33.8	+9.9
Turnout		3,760	29.6	+1.4
Labour hold		Swing		

=== Beauchief & Greenhill ===
Beauchief & Greenhill
Party	Candidate	Votes	%	±%
Liberal Democrats	Simon Clement-Jones*	2,072	38.3	−0.4
Labour	Neil Cleeveley	1,709	31.6	−2.0
Conservative	Michelle Grant	812	15.0	+3.6
BNP	John Beatson	508	9.4	−0.9
Green	David Hayes	304	5.6	−0.3
Majority		363	6.7	+1.6
Turnout		5,405	39.5	−1.8
Liberal Democrats hold		Swing		

=== Beighton ===
Beighton
Party	Candidate	Votes	%	±%
Labour	Chris Rosling-Josephs*	2,018	48.5	+5.8
Conservative	Shirley Clayton	1,068	25.6	+6.4
Liberal Democrats	Tracey Williams	695	16.7	+2.2
Green	Julian Brandram	384	9.2	+2.6
Majority		950	22.9	−0.6
Turnout		4,131	31.5	+1.3
Labour hold		Swing		

=== Birley ===
Birley
Party	Candidate	Votes	%	±%
Labour	Denise Fox*	2,352	53.6	+4.0
Liberal Democrats	Ben Curran	715	16.3	−2.5
Conservative	Gordon Millward	669	15.2	+1.9
Green	Frank Plunkett	375	8.5	±0.0
UKIP	Jenny Ruchat	279	6.4	−3.3
Majority		1,637	37.3	+6.5
Turnout		4,390	34.3	+2.7
Labour hold		Swing		

=== Broomhill ===
Broomhill
Party	Candidate	Votes	%	±%
Liberal Democrats	Alan Whitehouse*	1,390	45.4	+3.8
Green	Rob Cole	832	27.2	+2.7
Labour	Colin Roth	516	16.8	−2.7
Conservative	Michael Ginn	326	10.6	−3.7
Majority		558	18.2	+1.1
Turnout		3,064	26.1	+0.7
Liberal Democrats hold		Swing		

=== Burngreave ===
Burngreave
Party	Candidate	Votes	%	±%
Labour	Ibrar Hussein*	2,774	51.6	+2.7
Respect	Maxine Bowler	1,290	24.0	−1.9
Conservative	Russell Cutts	518	9.6	+0.5
Green	Chris Sissons	438	8.2	−0.4
Liberal Democrats	Mohamed Hersi	351	6.5	−1.0
Majority		1,484	27.6	+4.6
Turnout		5,371	36.7	+2.8
Labour hold		Swing		

=== Central ===
Central
Party	Candidate	Votes	%	±%
Green	Jillian Creasy*	1,451	35.6	+3.0
Labour	Mohammed Maroof	1,264	31.0	−0.5
Liberal Democrats	Mohammed Azim	928	22.8	−6.4
Conservative	June Ledbury	276	6.8	+0.1
Respect	Anwar Ali	157	3.9	N/A
Majority		187	4.6	+3.4
Turnout		4,076	31.0	+0.6
Green hold		Swing		

=== Crookes ===
Crookes
Party	Candidate	Votes	%	±%
Liberal Democrats	John Hesketh*	2,856	53.8	+5.2
Conservative	Robert McIleven	917	17.3	−1.2
Labour	Felicity Matthews	874	16.5	+0.3
Green	Gemma Lock	657	12.4	−2.0
Majority		1,939	36.6	+6.5
Turnout		5,304	39.0	+0.7
Liberal Democrats hold		Swing		

=== Darnall ===
Darnall
Party	Candidate	Votes	%	±%
Labour	Harry Harpham*	2,152	45.2	−9.6
Respect	Miron Rahman	1,041	21.9	N/A
Liberal Democrats	Frank Taylor	532	11.2	−5.9
Conservative	Anne Corke	407	8.6	−0.4
UKIP	Charlotte Arnott	370	7.8	−3.5
Green	Julie White	256	5.4	−2.4
Majority		1,111	23.4	−14.2
Turnout		4,758	34.2	+2.8
Labour hold		Swing		

=== Dore & Totley ===
Dore & Totley
Party	Candidate	Votes	%	±%
Liberal Democrats	Mike Davis	3,660	52.2	−0.6
Conservative	Caroline Cooper	2,488	35.5	−1.2
Labour	Albert Smith	419	6.0	+1.8
Green	Dawn Biram	278	4.0	+0.2
UKIP	Jim Laurie	173	2.5	+0.1
Majority		7,018	16.7	+0.6
Turnout		1,172	53.1	−1.2
Liberal Democrats gain from Conservative		Swing		

=== East Ecclesfield ===
East Ecclesfield
Party	Candidate	Votes	%	±%
Liberal Democrats	Victoria Bowden*	1,563	37.1	−9.0
Labour	Angela Wetherall	1,489	35.4	±0.0
BNP	Matthew Baxter	553	13.1	N/A
Conservative	George Needham	389	9.2	−0.8
Green	Jennyfer Barnard	215	5.1	−3.4
Majority		74	1.8	−8.9
Turnout		4,209	29.9	−2.4
Liberal Democrats hold		Swing		

=== Ecclesall ===
Ecclesall
Party	Candidate	Votes	%	±%
Liberal Democrats	Mike Reynolds*	3,496	53.5	+1.7
Conservative	Michael Young	1,673	25.6	+0.1
Green	Arun Mathur	720	11.0	−1.4
Labour	David Walton	649	9.9	+0.6
Majority		1,823	27.9	+1.6
Turnout		6,538	45.5	−0.3
Liberal Democrats hold		Swing		

=== Firth Park ===
Firth Park
Party	Candidate	Votes	%	±%
Labour	Chris Weldon*	2,067	53.5	−1.5
BNP	Mike Smith	660	17.1	N/A
Liberal Democrats	John Tomlinson	459	11.9	−7.1
Conservative	Paul Rymill	397	10.3	−2.7
Green	Jonathon Cook	283	7.3	−5.8
Majority		1,407	36.4	+0.4
Turnout		3,866	30.0	+3.2
Labour hold		Swing		

=== Fulwood ===
Fulwood
Party	Candidate	Votes	%	±%
Liberal Democrats	Andy Sangar*	3,155	56.1	+8.9
Conservative	Ian Pritchard	1,546	27.5	−6.3
Labour	Jack Scott	411	7.3	−0.8
Green	Stephen Hitchens	404	7.2	−1.2
UKIP	Maurice Patterson	107	1.9	−0.6
Majority		1,609	28.6	+15.2
Turnout		5,623	46.2	+4.2
Liberal Democrats hold		Swing		

=== Gleadless Valley ===
Gleadless Valley
Party	Candidate	Votes	%	±%
Liberal Democrats	Denise Reaney	2,114	39.0	+3.7
Labour	Rosemary Telfer*	2,063	38.1	+1.8
Green	Rob Unwin	856	15.8	−5.2
Conservative	Amy Taylor	381	7.0	−0.4
Majority		51	0.9	N/A
Turnout		5,414	39.8	+4.7
Liberal Democrats gain from Labour		Swing		

=== Graves Park ===
Graves Park
Party	Candidate	Votes	%	±%
Liberal Democrats	Ian Auckland*	2,321	43.7	+5.6
Labour	Bob Pemberton	1,384	26.1	−1.3
Conservative	Trevor Grant	784	14.8	−0.5
Green	Robert Murphy	424	8.0	−1.8
UKIP	Pauline Arnott	204	3.8	−1.6
Socialist Alternative	Celvin Payne	194	3.7	−0.4
Majority		937	17.6	+6.8
Turnout		5,311	40.2	+1.0
Liberal Democrats hold		Swing		

=== Hillsborough ===
Hillsborough
Party	Candidate	Votes	%	±%
Liberal Democrats	Steve Ayris	2,425	44.4	+7.8
Labour	Alf Meade*	1,934	35.4	−6.0
BNP	John Sheldon	475	8.7	N/A
Green	Chris McMahon	354	6.5	−6.0
Conservative	Peter Smith	271	5.0	−4.5
Majority		491	9.0	N/A
Turnout		5,459	41.2	+6.4
Liberal Democrats gain from Labour		Swing		

=== Manor Castle ===
Manor Castle
Party	Candidate	Votes	%	±%
Labour	Jenny Armstrong	1,932	60.6	+2.4
Liberal Democrats	Dave Croft	542	17.0	+3.8
Green	Graham Wroe	399	12.5	−4.7
Conservative	Christina Stark	314	9.9	−1.6
Majority		1,390	43.6	+2.6
Turnout		3,187	27.7	+3.8
Labour hold		Swing		

=== Mosborough ===
Mosborough
Party	Candidate	Votes	%	±%
Labour	David Barker*	1,859	41.7	+0.9
Liberal Democrats	Gail Smith	1,510	33.8	+5.5
Conservative	Eve Millward	685	15.3	−2.2
UKIP	Mark Suter	248	5.6	−2.1
Green	Heather Hunt	161	3.6	−2.0
Majority		349	7.8	−4.7
Turnout		4,463	33.7	+3.1
Labour hold		Swing		

=== Nether Edge ===
Nether Edge
Party	Candidate	Votes	%	±%
Liberal Democrats	Colin France	2,061	39.0	−1.4
Labour	Jim Lafferty	1,626	30.8	−1.7
Green	Mervyn Smith	1,045	19.8	+1.4
Conservative	Roy Ledbury	549	10.4	+1.7
Majority		435	8.2	+0.4
Turnout		5,281	39.8	−3.2
Liberal Democrats hold		Swing		

=== Richmond ===
Richmond
Party	Candidate	Votes	%	±%
Labour	John Campbell*	2,118	51.8	+3.7
Liberal Democrats	Chris Tutt	648	15.8	−3.7
Conservative	Ian Fey	470	11.5	±0.0
UKIP	Les Arnott	384	9.4	−3.9
Green	Eamonn Ward	236	5.8	−1.8
Independent	Elsie Smith	234	5.7	N/A
Majority		1,470	35.9	+7.2
Turnout		4,090	31.6	+1.8
Labour hold		Swing		

=== Shiregreen & Brightside ===
Shiregreen & Brightside
Party	Candidate	Votes	%	±%
Labour	Peter Price*	2,200	51.7	+3.2
BNP	Chris Hartigan	1,013	23.8	−2.3
Liberal Democrats	Joe Taylor	472	11.1	±0.0
Conservative	Mohammed Tariq	323	7.6	−0.6
Green	Steve Brady	245	5.8	−0.4
Majority		1,187	27.9	+5.6
Turnout		4,253	30.7	+2.3
Labour hold		Swing		

=== Southey ===
Southey
Party	Candidate	Votes	%	±%
Labour	Leigh Bramall*	2,099	53.8	+7.7
BNP	Tracey Smith	731	18.7	−0.4
Liberal Democrats	John Bowden	537	13.8	+3.0
Conservative	Eric Kirby	357	9.2	−0.9
Green	Steve Barnard	177	4.5	+0.4
Majority		1,368	35.1	+8.1
Turnout		3,901	29.3	+2.3
Labour hold		Swing		

=== Stannington ===
Stannington
Party	Candidate	Votes	%	±%
Liberal Democrats	Vickie Priestley*	2,792	49.4	+2.5
Labour	Max Telfer	1,446	25.6	−2.1
Conservative	John Walsh	926	16.4	+0.9
Green	Martin Bradshaw	489	8.7	−1.2
Majority		1,346	23.8	+4.6
Turnout		5,653	40.4	+2.5
Liberal Democrats hold		Swing		

=== Stocksbridge & Upper Don ===
Stocksbridge & Upper Don
Party	Candidate	Votes	%	±%
Liberal Democrats	Martin Brelsford*	2,067	39.3	−8.8
Labour	Phil Wood	1,273	24.2	+0.3
Conservative	Matthew Dixon	924	17.6	+1.5
BNP	David Wright	534	10.2	N/A
Green	Angela Roberts	463	8.8	−3.2
Majority		794	15.1	−9.1
Turnout		5,261	36.5	+4.3
Liberal Democrats hold		Swing		

=== Walkley ===
Walkley
Party	Candidate	Votes	%	±%
Liberal Democrats	Penny Baker	2,112	41.4	+0.8
Labour	Veronica Hardstaff*	2,076	40.7	+1.8
Green	Barry New	594	11.6	−2.0
Conservative	Benedict Hazel	323	6.3	−0.5
Majority		36	0.7	−1.0
Turnout		5,105	38.6	+3.1
Liberal Democrats gain from Labour		Swing		

=== West Ecclesfield ===
West Ecclesfield
Party	Candidate	Votes	%	±%
Liberal Democrats	Alan Hooper*	2,593	52.3	+2.7
Labour	Matthew Peck	1,533	30.9	−1.5
Conservative	Paula Mayfield	557	11.2	+0.6
Green	Kathryn Aston	275	5.5	−1.8
Majority		1,060	21.4	+4.2
Turnout		4,958	35.2	+0.5
Liberal Democrats hold		Swing		

=== Woodhouse ===
Woodhouse
Party	Candidate	Votes	%	±%
Labour	Mick Rooney*	2,307	53.4	+3.8
UKIP	Jonathan Arnott	681	15.8	+1.3
Liberal Democrats	Chris Bingham	553	12.8	−2.4
Conservative	Laurence Hayward	514	11.9	−1.9
Green	John Gant	267	6.2	−0.8
Majority		1,626	37.6	+3.2
Turnout		4,322	32.9	+2.2
Labour hold		Swing		
