= Dan Lyons =

CEO of the Centre for Animals and Social Justice

- Born: Daniel Louis Lyons
- Education: Social and political studies, University of Sheffield, 1990–1993; PhD, politics, University of Sheffield, 2006
- Occupations: CEO, Centre for Animals and Social Justice
- Awards: Political Studies Association's Walter Bagehot Prize for Government and Public Administration, 2007
- Website: Dan Lyons; University of Sheffield.

Daniel Louis Lyons is the chief executive officer of the Centre for Animals and Social Justice, a British animal protection charity. He is an honorary research fellow at the University of Sheffield and the author of The Politics of Animal Experimentation (2013).

Lyons specializes in the study of animal research, the philosophy of animal rights, and the political representation of animals' interests. He is the former campaigns director of Uncaged Campaigns (1993–2012), a group that opposed animal experiments in the UK, in particular xenotransplantation. During his time with Uncaged, Lyons became known as the author of Diaries of Despair (2000), a report that reproduced and analysed leaked documents about pig-to-primate organ transplants.

== Education ==
Lyons studied social and political studies as an undergraduate at the University of Sheffield from 1990 to 1993 and in 2006 obtained his PhD for a thesis entitled Protecting Animals Versus the Pursuit of Knowledge: The Evolution of the British Animal Research Policy Network.

His work won the Department of Politics' Andrew Gamble Prize for the outstanding thesis of 2006–2007, and the Walter Bagehot Prize for Government and Public Administration, awarded by the Political Studies Association. The thesis developed into a book, The Politics of Animal Experimentation, published by Palgrave Macmillan in 2013, with a foreword by Wyn Grant, Professor of Politics at the University of Warwick.

== Career ==
=== Uncaged Campaigns ===
After graduating from Sheffield in 1993, Lyons became campaigns director of Uncaged Campaigns, a group in the UK that opposed animal experimentation. He was the author in 2000 of a 157-page Uncaged Campaigns report into xenotransplantation, Diaries of Despair: The Secret History of Pig-to-Primate Organ Transplant. The report analysed 1,274 leaked pages about research into transplants from pigs to nonhuman primates, conducted between 1994 and 2000 by Huntingdon Life Sciences on behalf of Imutran Ltd, a subsidiary of the Swiss pharmaceutical company Novartis Pharma AG. According to an RSPCA report, the research involved transplanting pigs' hearts, kidneys, pancreatic islets or bone into wild-caught baboons or cynomolgous macaques, or transplanting the macaques' hearts into the baboons.

Material from the Diaries appeared in September 2000 in the Daily Express in the UK before Imutran obtained an injunction preventing further publication. Novartis closed Imutran shortly afterwards, but said it was unrelated to the leaks. The Express journalists won a Genesis Award for the story.

A key point of Lyons' report was that the animals' suffering was severe, but most of the procedures had been classed as "moderate" by the researchers. The RSPCA obtained a court order in October 2000 to allow it to review the report, and published its own report in 2002. Home Secretary Jack Straw asked the Home Office Chief Inspector to examine the evidence. In 2003 Lyons obtained a court order allowing him to publish most of the Diaries, and the Observer was able to publish a summary of it. Lyons subsequently used the leaked material to study animal research policy in the UK, an area not examined often by academics because of the difficulty of obtaining primary-source material. This formed the basis of his PhD thesis and subsequent book.

=== Centre for Animals and Social Justice ===
In 2011 Lyons became a founding member of the Centre for Animals and Social Justice, along with political scientists Robert Garner of the University of Leicester, and Alasdair Cochrane of the University of Sheffield. Lyons was appointed as the centre's chief executive officer. The aim of the group is to develop expertise about the access of nonhuman animals to social and political justice, and to "embed animal protection as a core goal of public policy" in the UK.

=== Politics ===
Lyons served from 2007 to 2011 as a Green Party councillor on Stocksbridge Town Council, Sheffield. He stood unsuccessfully as a Green Party candidate for Sheffield City Council in the 2011 and 2012 elections.

== Awards ==
- Andrew Gamble Prize for the outstanding thesis of 2006–2007, University of Sheffield Department of Politics, 2007.
- Walter Bagehot Prize for Government and Public Administration, Political Studies Association, 2007.
- Arthur Ling Memorial Award, Plamil Foods, 2007.

== Selected works ==
- Diaries of Despair, Uncaged Campaigns, 2003, first published 2000.
- In a Collapsed State: Imutran Xenotransplantation Research. A Case Study of Home Office Enforcement of Animal Experimentation Legislation, Uncaged Campaigns, 2004.
- "Animal-to-Human Transplantation is Dangerous and Immoral," in Laura K. Egendorf (ed.), Medical Ethics, Greenhaven Press, 2005.
- "Protecting Animals versus the Pursuit of Knowledge: The Evolution of the British Animal Research Policy Process", Society & Animals, 19, 2011, pp. 356–367.
- The Politics of Animal Experimentation, Palgrave Macmillan, 2013.
- Disrupted: Ludicrous Misadventures in the Tech Start-up Bubble, Hachette, 2016.
- Lab Rats: How Silicon Valley Made Work Miserable for the Rest of Us, Hachette, 2018.

== See also ==
- List of animal rights advocates
