= Steve Moxon (whistleblower) =

British former civil servant

Steven Paul Moxon is a British former civil servant who came to prominence as a whistleblower in March 2004 while he was employed as a caseworker at the Home Office, the ministerial department of the United Kingdom that handles immigration. Moxon revealed that immigration checks were not being followed for people from Eastern European countries which were due to join the European Union later that year. This led to the resignation of the junior Home Office minister Beverley Hughes.

Moxon was selected as a UK Independence Party (UKIP) candidate for the 2012 local elections in Sheffield, but was deselected following comments he made on his blog about the Norwegian mass murderer Anders Behring Breivik.

Moxon has written two books: one on immigration and the other on the science of the relationship between the sexes. The former attracted praise from some critics, but was criticised by others as "highly selective" and Islamophobic. The latter has been described as "singularly odd" and "wilfully controversial".

== Early life ==
Moxon studied psychology at the University of Liverpool in the late 1970s. He has described the BSc course as "appallingly poor", explaining that "behaviourism and even psychoanalysis still held sway, before psychology gained an evolutionary underpinning", and states that the experience "turned me off academia". He was a Liberal Democrat party activist for many years.

== Home Office ==
Moxon came to public prominence as a whistleblower in March 2004, while working at the Home Office. Moxon was a caseworker in the Home Office's Immigration and Nationality Directorate in Sheffield. He claimed that immigration checks had been waived for people from the eight countries in central and eastern Europe that were due to join the European Union in May of that year, so as to make migration flows following EU enlargement look less dramatic. The allegations were published in the Sunday Times. Moxon's revelations, along with those of two other whistleblowers, resulted in the resignation of junior minister Beverley Hughes. Moxon himself was dismissed from his civil service job. Initially, he was feted by figures from the opposition Conservative Party including Michael Howard and David Davis, but they distanced themselves from him when it was revealed that Moxon had e-mailed the website of the BBC's Panorama programme claiming that: "An international alliance of Islamic Year Zeros feverishly exporting death to 'infidel' and non-fundamentalist Muslims alike...eventually will have to be silenced by nuclear weapons".

Moxon subsequently wrote a book, The Great Immigration Scandal, which was published by Imprint Academic in August 2004. David Davis had been scheduled to chair the launch event for the book, but withdrew "amid claims that the book was an Islamophobic rant". A Conservative Party spokesman reported that Davis "had agreed to go provisionally and talk in favour of Steve as a whistleblower. But that was before he saw the contents of the book. He then felt unable to attend". According to The Guardian, the book "claims the term 'paki' is not racist; predicts immigration leading to Ulster-style civil war; and Asians are more likely to be organised criminals". Labour MP Frank Field reviewed the book for the Sunday Times, describing it as a "slow-burn Molotov cocktail on immigration". It received positive endorsements from commentators including Andrew Green of MigrationWatch UK and David G. Green of Civitas. Academic Neil Lunt, reviewing the book in the journal Political Studies Review, gave it one star and wrote that: "Scandals are everywhere and doomsday scenarios litter the text. There is a lack of clear and judicious argument: referencing is highly selective, and there are frequent sweeping and unsupported statements. Moxon fails to convey an understanding of many issues including structural discrimination, the 1951 Refugee Convention and Britain's relationship to Empire. In some places the text is well written; in others it resembles a teenager's diary. Further, alongside the now familiar caricatures of migrant scroungers, there were also inappropriate and offensive references vis-à-vis women, disability and race".

Following his sacking, Moxon announced that he would take the Home Office to an employment tribunal for unfair dismissal. In July 2005, on the day the tribunal was scheduled for, Moxon and the Home Office reached an out-of-court settlement. Moxon reportedly accepted a settlement of between £40,000 and £50,000, and signed a gagging clause.

== Independent researcher ==
In an interview with the Evening Standard published in 2007, Moxon stated that he didn't "have a particular interest" in debates about immigration, noting that his passion was instead for psychology, and that he had previously dropped out of a psychology degree course. Moxon now describes himself as an independent researcher. He stated in 2007 that the payout he received from the Home Office as a result of their out-of-court settlement enabled him "to not have to work for a while, so that's when I started writing". In 2008, his second book, The Woman Racket: The New Science Explaining How the Sexes Relate at Work, at Play and in Society, was published by Imprint Academic. According to Andy McSmith of The Independent, the book expounds Moxon's "thesis that men are the disadvantaged sex". In a review, philosopher George Williamson wrote that it was "a singularly odd book". He argued that, despite the book's subtitle, "the science presented isn't all that new, nor is much science presented" and that "there are myriad concerns with the details of the science [Moxon] invokes". Novelist Lionel Shriver wrote in the Guardian that it was a "wilfully controversial book claiming that men are the downtrodden sex, so pretentious and badly written that even the happy prospect of finding it offensive couldn't pull me through".

In 2012, Moxon was ranked by an anti-feminist website as one of the ten most powerful people in the men's rights movement. He has also given evidence to a House of Commons Business, Innovation and Skills Select Committee inquiry into women in the workplace. It was reported that Moxon had suggested to the committee that women were "incapable" of rising to senior management positions. Feminist writer Laura Bates argued that it was worrying that the select committee "should be seeking out the view of someone who has openly expressed these opinions and demonstrated that he is prejudiced against women as a gender". Committee member Robin Walker noted that Moxon was chosen to ensure "a wide range of views" was represented, but that "He was definitely on the extreme end and he didn't come across as very reasonable at all".

Moxon made a complaint to the BBC Trust about coverage of the select committee's inquiry in an episode of the BBC Radio 4 programme Woman's Hour, broadcast in December 2012. He complained that he had not in fact claimed that women were incapable of becoming bosses. Moxon's claim that the programme "had over many years displayed unfairness to men generically and had dismissed scientific research on men/women" was dismissed, as were three of Moxon's other complaints, including that about the characterisation of his evidence to the inquiry. His complaint that the presenter misrepresented him as "a man who describes himself as an academic" was, however, upheld. In his complaint, Moxon stated that he describes himself as an "independent cross-disciplinary researcher/writer on the biological roots of human sociality with a particular interest in the sexes", and noted that he did not have a university affiliation.

In 2021, he wrote an article for the Yorkshire Dialect Society, which argued that many words in the western half of Yorkshire have Scottish Gaelic roots. Two years later, another article in the same journal denounced Moxon's claims as baseless.

== UK Independence Party ==
In 2012, Moxon was due to stand as a UK Independence Party candidate in local elections in Sheffield, but he was deselected by the party after endorsing the analysis contained in the "manifesto" of Norwegian mass-murderer Anders Breivik. Moxon had written on his blog that: "That pretty well everyone—myself not excluded—recoiled at his actions, does not belie the accuracy of Breivik's research and analysis in his 'manifesto', which is in line with most scholarship in respect of both Political Correctness and Islam". Moxon and UKIP both noted that he had not said that he condoned Breivik's crimes, but the party noted that "he has made a number of remarks on subjects such as the Breivik manifesto and Islam that are at odds with UKIP policy and perspective". He came fifth (last) place, winning 363 votes in the Dore and Totley ward.

According to Moxon's personal website, his politics were originally "centre-Left/'green'". He states that he was "a Liberal-Democrat activist for the best part of two decades". According to a 2004 article in the Sheffield Star, Moxon also "claims to have played a part in the backroom team for the election campaign of Hallam MP Richard Allan".

== Books ==
- Moxon, Steve (2006). The great immigration scandal (2nd ed.). Exeter, UK: Imprint Academic. ISBN 184540078X.
- Moxon, Steve (2008). The woman racket : the new science explaining how the sexes relate at work, at play and in society. Exeter: Imprint Academic. ISBN 978-1845401504.
