= Centre for Animals and Social Justice =

British charity

- Founded: June 2011
- Type: Charitable company limited by guarantee
- Purpose: Animal protection
- Location: Sheffield, England
- Key people: Dan Lyons, CEO
- Website: www.casj.org.uk

The Centre for Animals and Social Justice (CASJ) is a British charity founded in 2011 to advance the social and political status of nonhuman animals. The CASJ aims to "embed animal protection as a core goal of public policy." Dan Lyons, former campaigns director of Uncaged Campaigns and an honorary research fellow at the University of Sheffield, is the chief executive officer. Angela Roberts, founder of Uncaged Campaigns is the MD.

In addition to Lyons, other founding members are political theorists Alasdair Cochrane and Robert Garner of the University of Sheffield and University of Leicester respectively.

One of the issues the CASJ explores is how nonhumans can be offered political representation as vulnerable individuals. The CASJ was involved in 2012 with other animal protection groups in consulting with members of parliament over an amendment to the Animals (Scientific Procedures) Act 1986. In 2014 the CASJ garnered the support of 16 animal protection organizations in support of a governmental Animal Protection Commission.

== See also ==
- Animal protectionism
