= 2012 Sheffield City Council election =

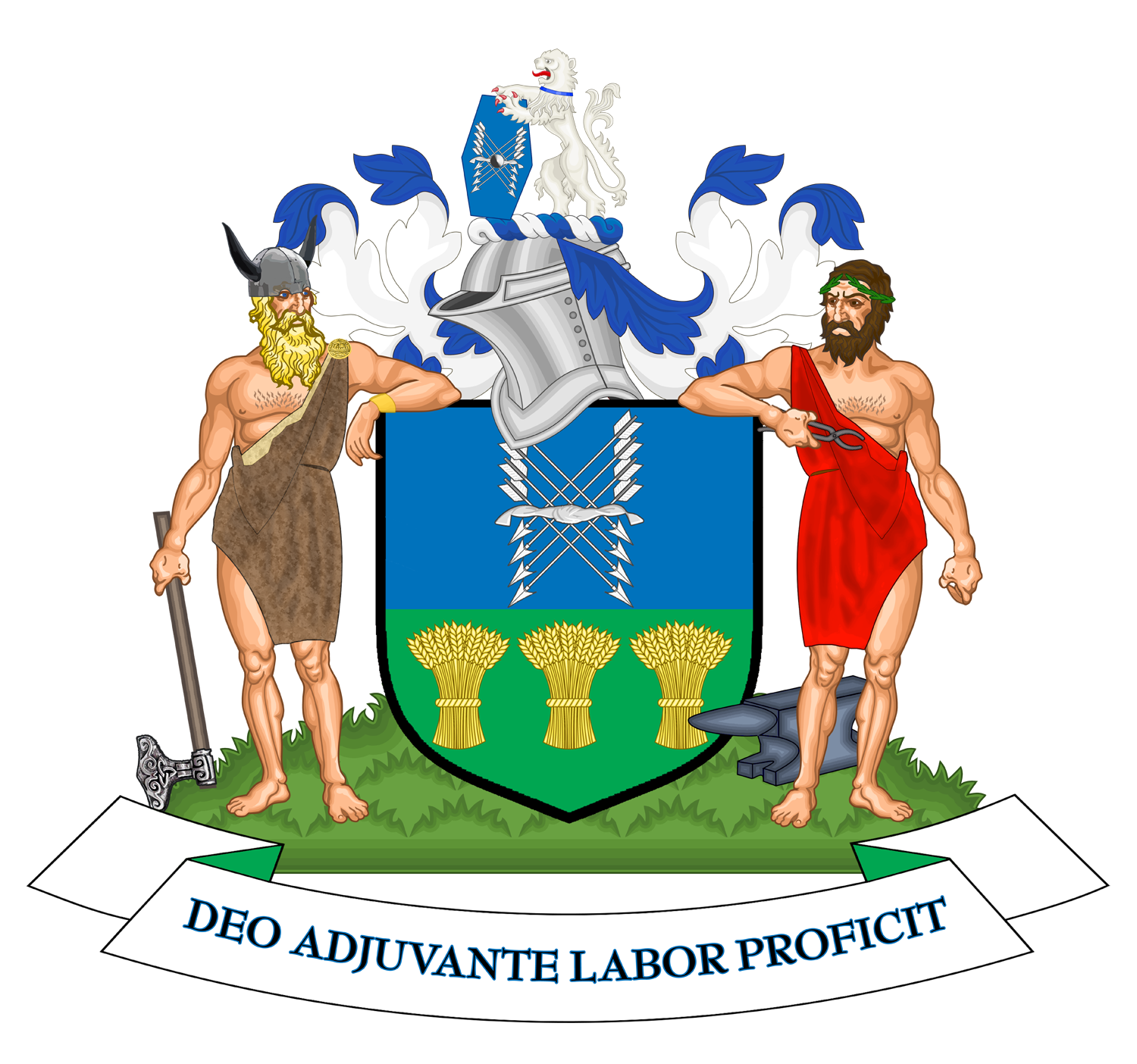
← 2011	3 May 2012	2014 →

One third of seats (28 of 84) to Sheffield City Council 43 seats needed for a majority
	First party	Second party
Party	Labour	Liberal Democrats
Seats won	21	6
Seat change	▲9	▼9
	Third party	Fourth party
Party	Green	UKIP
Seats won	1	0
Seat change	0	0
- Map showing the results of the 2012 Sheffield City Council elections.
Majority party before election
Labour
Majority party after election
Labour

Sheffield City Council elections took place on Thursday 3 May 2012 as part of the 2012 United Kingdom local elections.

There were 28 seats up for election, one third of the council. The last election in 2011 gave Labour a majority over the Liberal Democrats with 49 councillors. However, one Independent councillor joined Labour after the election, giving the party 50 seats.

Four main parties fielded a full slate of 28 candidates. UKIP also put up a full slate, but Steve Moxon was disendorsed as the party's candidate for Dore and Totley. Labour were defending 11 seats, all of which they successfully held in 2011. The Liberal Democrats were defending 16 seats, 10 of which they lost to Labour in 2011. The Greens were defending 1 seat, which they held in 2011. The Conservatives, UKIP and the smaller parties had no councillors.

== Election result ==
Sheffield City Council election, 2012
Party	Seats	Gains	Losses	Net gain/loss	Seats %	Votes %	Votes	+/−
Labour	21	10	0	+10	75.0	46.9	61,036	-1.0
Liberal Democrats	6	0	10	-10	21.4	22.0	28,605	-3.9
UKIP	0	0	0	0	0.0	10.5	13,612	+8.7
Green	1	0	0	0	3.6	10.4	13,607	-0.8
Conservative	0	0	0	0	0.0	8.2	10,724	-3.5
TUSC	0	0	0	0	0.0	1.0	1,266	+0.2
Independent	0	0	0	0	0.0	0.9	1,222	+0.7
English Democrat	0	0	0	0	0.0	0.1	174	New

The Labour Party gained ten seats from their position following the 2008 election, but this included a seat gained already gained from the Liberal Democrats via defection in Gleadless Valley.

This result had the following consequences for the total number of seats on the council after the elections:

Party	Previous council	New council	+/-
Labour	50	59	▲9
Liberal Democrats	32	23	▼9
Greens	2	2	0
Total	84	84	
Working majority	16	34	

== Ward results ==
=== Arbourthorne ===
Arbourthorne
Party	Candidate	Votes	%	±%
Labour	Julie Dore*	2,303	62.3	+3.4
UKIP	David Sheriden	544	14.7	N/A
Conservative	Peter Smith	299	8.1	−2.2
Green	Andrea Barnard	276	7.5	−11.8
Liberal Democrats	Patricia White	275	7.4	−3.9
Majority		1,759	47.6	+8.0
Turnout		3,697	28.18	−11.1
Labour hold		Swing		

=== Beauchief and Greenhill ===
Beauchief and Greenhill
Party	Candidate	Votes	%	±%
Labour	Roy Munn	2,393	45.9	+11.2
Liberal Democrats	Steve Ayris	1,642	31.5	−9.3
UKIP	Peter Boardman	534	10.3	+6.0
Conservative	Michelle Grant	345	6.6	−2.6
Green	Christina Hespe	296	5.7	+0.5
Majority		751	14.4	N/A
Turnout		5,210	38.14	−7.0
Labour gain from Liberal Democrats		Swing		

=== Beighton ===
Beighton
Party	Candidate	Votes	%	±%
Labour	Ian Saunders*	2,301	58.9	−2.3
UKIP	Sam Lander	589	15.1	N/A
Conservative	Shirley Clayton	535	13.7	−6.6
Liberal Democrats	Michael Shaw	299	7.7	−4.0
Green	Peter Garbutt	180	4.6	−2.2
Majority		1,712	43.9	+3.0
Turnout		3,904	29.36	−7.6
Labour hold		Swing		

=== Birley ===
Birley
Party	Candidate	Votes	%	±%
Labour	Bryan Lodge*	2,553	63.2	−2.5
UKIP	Graham Cheetham	555	13.7	N/A
Green	Frank Plunkett	257	6.4	−3.7
Liberal Democrats	Margaret Bowden	253	6.3	−4.1
Conservative	Calum Heaton	248	6.1	−7.7
English Democrat	David Wildgoose	174	4.3	N/A
Majority		1,998	49.5	−2.4
Turnout		4,040	31.40	−7.1
Labour hold		Swing		

=== Broomhill ===
Broomhill
Party	Candidate	Votes	%	±%
Labour	Jayne Dunn	1,303	37.0	+2.4
Green	James Little	1,102	31.3	+5.2
Liberal Democrats	Paul Scriven*	809	22.3	−4.9
Conservative	Timothy Moffatt	197	5.6	−4.4
UKIP	Pat Sullivan	107	3.0	+1.0
Majority		201	5.7	−1.7
Turnout		3,518	26.61	−11.2
Labour gain from Liberal Democrats		Swing		

=== Burngreave ===
Burngreave
Party	Candidate	Votes	%	±%
Labour	Jackie Drayton*	3,373	67.2	−0.1
TUSC	Maxine Bowler	708	14.1	+0.1
UKIP	Jean Simpson	271	5.4	N/A
Green	John Sissons	247	4.9	−2.6
Liberal Democrats	Tasadique Mohammed	241	4.8	+0.6
Conservative	Russell Cutts	181	3.6	−3.3
Majority		2,665	53.1	−0.2
Turnout		5,021	32.15	−6.3
Labour hold		Swing		

=== Central ===
Central
Party	Candidate	Votes	%	±%
Green	Rob Murphy*	2,165	48.7	+5.8
Labour	Mohammed Akbar	1,736	39.1	−0.5
Liberal Democrats	Muhammad Zahar	244	5.5	−5.2
Conservative	Owen Grey	161	3.6	−3.2
UKIP	Andrew Kitson	137	3.1	N/A
Majority		429	9.7	+4.6
Turnout		4,443	21.28	−9.7
Green hold		Swing		

=== Crookes ===
Crookes
Party	Candidate	Votes	%	±%
Liberal Democrats	Rob Frost	1,965	35.0	+2.5
Labour	Abdul Khayum	1,416	25.2	−14.4
Green	Amy Mack	808	14.4	−1.5
Independent	John Hesketh	736	13.1	−19.4
Conservative	James Hoyes	360	6.4	−5.5
UKIP	Alec Hayward	323	5.8	N/A
Majority		540	9.6	N/A
Turnout		5,608	40.15	−12.6
Liberal Democrats hold		Swing		

=== Darnall ===
Darnall
Party	Candidate	Votes	%	±%
Labour	Mary Lea*	2,978	56.6	−12.4
Liberal Democrats	Salim Zaman	1,149	21.8	+12.1
UKIP	Charlotte Arnott	556	10.6	+1.1
Independent	Mohammed Miah	220	4.2	N/A
Green	Julie White	209	4.0	−1.6
Conservative	Alan Ryder	149	2.8	−3.3
Majority		1,829	34.8	−24.5
Turnout		5,261	34.07	−1.5
Labour hold		Swing		

=== Dore and Totley ===
Dore and Totley
Party	Candidate	Votes	%	±%
Liberal Democrats	Colin Ross*	2,610	41.4	−1.5
Conservative	Anne Smith	2,140	34.0	+2.0
Labour	Hafeas Rehman	763	12.1	−6.0
Green	Rita Wilcock	422	6.7	−0.3
UKIP	Steve Moxon	363	5.8	N/A
Majority		470	7.5	−3.4
Turnout		6,298	47.02	−9.2
Liberal Democrats hold		Swing		

Steve Moxon was disendorsed by UKIP prior to the election, but still appeared on the ballot paper as the UKIP candidate.

=== East Ecclesfield ===
East Ecclesfield
Party	Candidate	Votes	%	±%
Labour	Joyce Wright	2,545	53.0	+5.9
Liberal Democrats	Colin Taylor*	1,167	24.3	−10.3
UKIP	Mark Price	551	11.5	N/A
Green	Kay Horsfield	270	5.6	+0.3
Conservative	Hilary Gay	268	5.6	−1.2
Majority		1,378	28.7	+16.2
Turnout		4,801	33.27	−9.9
Labour gain from Liberal Democrats		Swing		

=== Ecclesall ===
Ecclesall
Party	Candidate	Votes	%	±%
Liberal Democrats	Penny Baker	2,514	39.3	−1.4
Labour	Richard Lawrence	1,625	25.4	−0.5
Green	Arun Mathur	959	15.0	+0.8
Conservative	Christina Stark	891	13.9	−5.1
UKIP	Jason Sullivan	415	6.5	N/A
Majority		889	13.9	−0.9
Turnout		6,404	43.35	−13.1
Liberal Democrats hold		Swing		

=== Firth Park ===
Firth Park
Party	Candidate	Votes	%	±%
Labour	Sheila Constance	2,606	69.7	−5.4
UKIP	Matthew Ratcliffe	470	12.6	N/A
Green	Mick Ibbotson	307	8.2	−0.1
Conservative	Judith Burkinshaw	187	5.0	−4.0
Liberal Democrats	James Tosseano	168	4.5	−3.0
Majority		2,136	57.1	−9.0
Turnout		3,738	26.62	−5.9
Labour hold		Swing		

=== Fulwood ===
Fulwood
Party	Candidate	Votes	%	±%
Liberal Democrats	Susan Alston	2,144	38.6	−1.4
Conservative	Vonny Watts	1,331	24.0	+2.8
Labour	Pauline Wood	1,026	18.5	−5.8
Green	Judith Rutnam	731	13.2	−1.3
UKIP	Nigel James	318	5.7	N/A
Majority		813	14.6	−1.1
Turnout		5,550	38.62	−15.5
Liberal Democrats hold		Swing		

=== Gleadless Valley ===
Gleadless Valley
Party	Candidate	Votes	%	±%
Labour	Steve Jones	2,693	56.5	+5.2
Green	Steve Barnard	748	15.7	+4.4
Liberal Democrats	Richard Shaw	479	10.1	−19.6
UKIP	Vincent Foster	421	8.8	N/A
Conservative	Jenny Grant	247	5.2	+0.6
TUSC	Alan Munro	176	3.7	+0.7
Majority		1,945	40.8	+19.2
Turnout		4,764	33.20	−11.1
Labour gain from Liberal Democrats		Swing		

The result in Gleadless Valley did not change the numbers on the council, as the sitting Liberal Democrat councillor had previously defected to Labour.

=== Graves Park ===
Graves Park
Party	Candidate	Votes	%	±%
Liberal Democrats	Denise Reaney	2,093	39.2	−1.4
Labour	Bob Pemberton	1,994	37.4	−1.1
UKIP	Pauline Arnott	398	7.5	N/A
Green	David Hayes	393	7.4	+2.6
Conservative	Trevor Grant	342	6.4	−7.4
TUSC	Sam Morecroft	116	2.2	−0.1
Majority		99	1.9	−0.2
Turnout		5,336	39.81*	−8.4
Liberal Democrats hold		Swing		

- Turnout percentage figure for Graves Park ward is not from official source. Calculated as (total votes/electorate)

=== Hillsborough ===
Hillsborough
Party	Candidate	Votes	%	±%
Labour	George Lindars-Hammond	2,424	53.3	−1.2
Liberal Democrats	Jonathan Harston	682	14.1	−15.0
UKIP	Paul Hirst	570	12.5	N/A
Green	Chris McMahon	481	10.6	+1.0
Conservative	Nigel Bonson	261	5.7	−1.1
TUSC	Wyllie Hume	130	2.9	N/A
Majority		1,742	38.3	+12.8
Turnout		4,548	32.76	−11.8
Labour gain from Liberal Democrats		Swing		

=== Manor Castle ===
Manor Castle
Party	Candidate	Votes	%	±%
Labour	Pat Midgley*	2,228	72.1	+0.9
UKIP	Les Arnott	308	10.0	N/A
Green	Graham Wroe	272	8.8	−2.4
Liberal Democrats	Jack Williams	179	5.8	−3.3
Conservative	Josh Lahlou	105	3.4	−3.4
Majority		1,920	62.1	+0.4
Turnout		3,092	23.18	−6.9
Labour hold		Swing		

=== Mosborough ===
Mosborough
Party	Candidate	Votes	%	±%
Labour	Tony Downing	2,463	54.1	+0.1
Liberal Democrats	Gail Smith*	1,113	24.4	−6.6
UKIP	Thomas Booker	518	11.4	N/A
Conservative	Paul Nizinskyj	297	6.5	−4.2
Green	Sarah Smalley	166	3.6	−0.8
Majority		1,350	29.6	+6.6
Turnout		4,557	33.23	−8.7
Labour gain from Liberal Democrats		Swing		

=== Nether Edge ===
Nether Edge
Party	Candidate	Votes	%	±%
Labour	Nikki Bond	2,570	47.2	+3.1
Liberal Democrats	Iltaf Hussain	1,425	26.2	−4.1
Green	Rob Cole	1,000	18.4	+3.0
UKIP	Jeffrey Shaw	226	4.2	+2.2
Conservative	Afzal Shaikh	225	4.1	−1.0
Majority		1,145	21.0	+7.3
Turnout		5,446	40.43	−13.1
Labour gain from Liberal Democrats		Swing		

=== Richmond ===
Richmond
Party	Candidate	Votes	%	±%
Labour	Lynn Rooney*	2,385	64.8	−2.2
UKIP	Robert Sheridan	582	15.8	N/A
Liberal Democrats	Angela Hill	259	7.0	−3.6
Conservative	Andrew Sneddon	232	6.3	−5.0
Green	Richard Roper	220	6.0	−5.1
Majority		1,803	49.0	−6.7
Turnout		3,678	28.08	−6.9
Labour hold		Swing		

=== Shiregreen and Brightside ===
Shiregreen and Brightside
Party	Candidate	Votes	%	±%
Labour	Sioned-Mair Richards	2,402	67.3	−3.9
UKIP	Scott Wright	634	17.8	N/A
Green	Douglas Johnson	215	6.0	−4.4
Conservative	Eric Kirby	198	5.5	−5.1
Liberal Democrats	Sharon Mboueyeu	122	3.4	−4.4
Majority		1,768	49.5	−11.0
Turnout		3,571	25.17	−6.2
Labour hold		Swing		

=== Southey ===
Southey
Party	Candidate	Votes	%	±%
Labour	Tony Damms*	2,378	70.7	−1.7
UKIP	Michael Simpson	435	12.9	N/A
Green	Eamonn Ward	190	5.7	−2.9
Liberal Democrats	Chris Tosseano	181	5.4	−4.6
Conservative	James Gould	180	5.4	−2.6
Majority		1,943	57.8	−4.6
Turnout		3,364	24.63	−5.4
Labour hold		Swing		

=== Stannington ===
Stannington
Party	Candidate	Votes	%	±%
Liberal Democrats	Kate Condliffe	2,228	40.5	+1.6
Labour	Max Telfer	1,944	35.4	−3.4
UKIP	John Greenfield	600	10.9	N/A
Green	Martin Bradshaw	400	7.3	−1.9
Conservative	Claudia Cole	325	5.9	−7.2
Majority		284	5.2	+5.1
Turnout		5,497	38.70	−7.5
Liberal Democrats hold		Swing		

=== Stocksbridge and Upper Don ===
Stocksbridge and Upper Don
Party	Candidate	Votes	%	±%
Labour	Richard Crowther	1,770	35.1	−1.9
UKIP	Grant French	1,386	27.5	+12.4
Liberal Democrats	Jack Clarkson*	1,220	24.2	−4.3
Conservative	Nigel Owen	408	8.1	−5.7
Green	Dan Lyons	260	5.2	−0.4
Majority		384	7.6	−0.9
Turnout		5,044	34.63	−8.7
Labour gain from Liberal Democrats		Swing		

=== Walkley ===
Walkley
Party	Candidate	Votes	%	±%
Labour	Neale Gibson	2,494	50.0	+2.8
Liberal Democrats	Diane Leek*	1,163	23.3	−5.9
Green	Calvin Payne	630	12.6	+1.4
UKIP	Richard Ratcliffe	392	7.8	+3.1
Conservative	John Levick	179	3.6	−0.7
TUSC	Chaz Lockett	136	2.7	+1.1
Majority		1,331	26.7	+8.7
Turnout		4,994	33.48	+2.3
Labour gain from Liberal Democrats		Swing		

=== West Ecclesfield ===
West Ecclesfield
Party	Candidate	Votes	%	±%
Labour	Adam Hurst	1,977	40.5	−2.6
Liberal Democrats	Alan Hooper	1,724	35.3	−4.6
UKIP	Simon Ellison	530	10.9	N/A
Independent	David Ogle	266	5.5	N/A
Conservative	Gabrielle Pitfield	215	4.4	−6.3
Green	Kathryn Aston	172	3.4	−2.9
Majority		253	5.2	+1.9
Turnout		4,884	34.74	−6.7
Labour gain from Liberal Democrats		Swing		

=== Woodhouse ===
Woodhouse
Party	Candidate	Votes	%	±%
Labour	Jackie Satur*	2,393	60.2	−2.7
UKIP	Jonathan Arnott	879	22.1	+9.0
Liberal Democrats	Leslie Abrahams	257	6.5	−3.9
Green	John Grant	231	5.8	+2.2
Conservative	Laurence Hayward	218	5.5	−4.4
Majority		1,514	38.1	−11.7
Turnout		3,978	29.81	−6.8
Labour hold		Swing		

== By-elections between 2012 and 2014 ==
Death of Liberal Democrat Cllr Janice Sidebottom.

Fulwood by-election, 2 May 2013
Party	Candidate	Votes	%	±%
Liberal Democrats	Cliff Woodcraft	2,563	48.3	+9.7
Labour	Olivia Blake	1,035	19.5	+1.0
Conservative	Vonny Watts	826	15.5	−8.5
UKIP	John Greenfield	501	9.4	+3.7
Green	Brian Webster	379	7.1	−6.1
Majority		1528	28.75	+14.2
Turnout		5,314	37.5	−1.12
Liberal Democrats hold		Swing	+2.4	

Death of Labour Cllr John Robson.

Arbourthorne by-election, 6 February 2014
Party	Candidate	Votes	%	±%
Labour	Mike Drabble	1,398	52.2	−10.1
UKIP	Bob Sheridan	482	18.0	+3.3
Conservative	Peter Smith	213	8.0	−0.1
TUSC	Alan Munro	204	7.6	N/A
Liberal Democrats	Susan Ross	161	6.0	−1.4
Green	Jennyfer Barnard	143	5.3	−2.2
English Democrat	David Wildgoose	75	2.8	N/A
Majority		916	34.2	
Turnout		2,676		
