= Uncaged Campaigns =

British non-profit organization

- Formation: 1993; 33 years ago
- Founder: Angela Roberts, Lynn Williamson
- Purpose: Animal rights

Uncaged Campaigns is a Sheffield, UK, based anti-vivisection, not-for-profit organization that advocates for animal rights.

== History ==
Uncaged Campaigns was established in 1993 by Angela Roberts and Lynn Williamson. They are a peaceful international animal protection organization based in Sheffield, England. Their main campaigns are opposition to animal experiments and xenotransplantation, the global boycott of Procter & Gamble, and the positive promotion of animal rights and democratic action on animal issues through the political system. Dan Lyons was campaigns director until becoming the CEO of the Centre for Animals and Social Justice in 2011.

Uncaged Campaigns is an animal rights organization that rejects animal welfare. They have commented that "animal welfare is an empty concept without the legal right to have that welfare protected. Uncaged promoted an international debate about the ethical and political status of animals and campaigned for international recognition of animal rights".

== Activism ==
Uncaged aims include:

- Opposition to the abuse of animals
- A scientific critique of vivisection
- A commitment to democracy, human and nonhuman rights, and environmental sustainability.

== Notability ==
Uncaged are noted for their campaigns in the UK against vivisection and in particular their Global Boycott of Procter & Gamble due to the company's continued use of animal testing for cosmetics. This has taken the form of media campaigns resulting in TV and newspaper coverage. They achieved publicity by projecting the message "Procter & Gamble test on animals" onto the Angel Of The North statue in March 2006.

Uncaged also won the legal right to publish the "Diaries of Despair" report and over a thousand pages of confidential documents that describe in unique detail experiments involving the transplant of genetically modified pig organs into five hundred primates. The papers reveal researchers at the former biotechnology company, Imutran, exaggerated the success of work aimed at adapting pig organs for human transplant.

In July 2009 Uncaged, along with MPs and MEPs from across the political spectrum, presented the largest ever British animal protection petition with 1.5 million signatures to 10 Downing Street. The petition called on the British Government to develop a roadmap for the elimination of animal experimentation. Uncaged has also garnered support from British politicians including Norman Baker MP, Liberal Democrat. The Uncaged website quotes him, "Uncaged keeps alive the flame of hope that one day, animal experiments will seem as outdated as today sending children up chimneys seems."

Uncaged has always maintained a peaceful protest philosophy.

== See also ==
- List of animal rights groups
