= 2021 Sheffield City Council election =

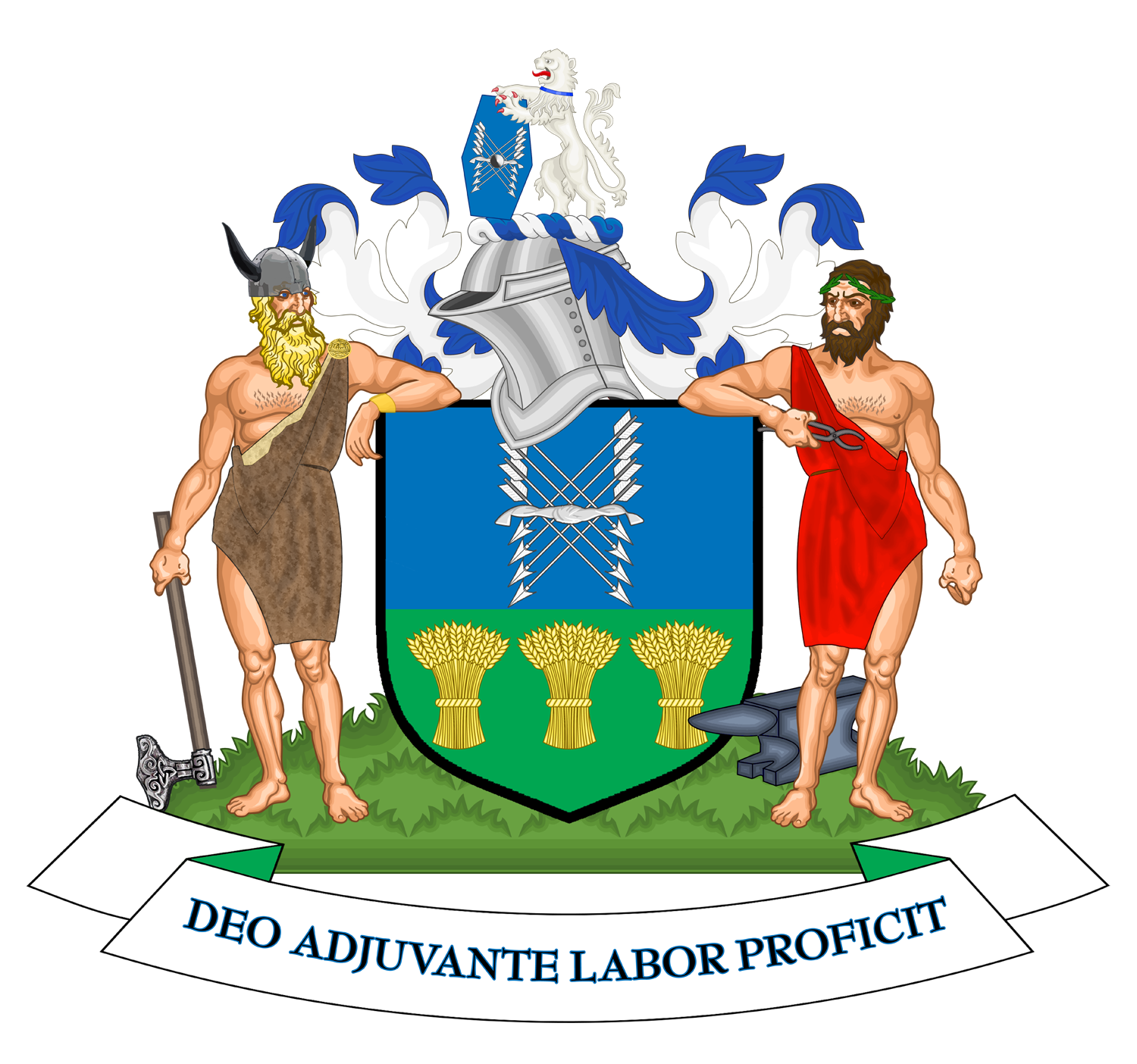
- 6 May 2021

One third of seats (28 of 84) to Sheffield City Council 43 seats needed for a majority
	First party	Second party
Leader	Bob Johnson (lost seat)	Shaffaq Mohammed
Party	Labour	Liberal Democrats
Seats won	13	9
Seat change	▼8	▲3
Popular vote	51,257	28,773
Percentage	36.6%	21.2%
Swing	▲5.0%	▼3.3%
	Third party	Fourth party
Leader	Douglas Johnson	TBD
Party	Green	Conservative
Seats won	6	1
Seat change	▲5	▲1
Popular vote	28,523	25,829
Percentage	20.4%	18.4%
Swing	▼2.1%	▲10.4%
- Results of the election.
Council control before election
Labour
Council control after election
No Overall Control (Lab/Grn coalition)

The 2021 Sheffield City Council election took place on 6 May 2021 to elect members of Sheffield City Council in England, as part of the nationwide local elections. The election was originally due to take place on 7 May 2020, but was postponed due to the COVID-19 pandemic. One seat from each ward was up for election.

A delayed local governance referendum (held under the provisions of the Localism Act 2011) also took place at the same time as the local elections.

== Overall election result ==
2021 Sheffield City Council election
Party	This election			Full council			This election		
Party	Seats	Net	Seats %	Other	Total	Total %	Votes	Votes %	+/−
Labour	13	▼8	44.8	28	41	48.8	51,297	36.6	+5.0
Liberal Democrats	9	▲3	31.0	20	29	34.5	29,735	21.2	-3.3
Green	6	▲5	20.7	7	13	15.5	28,523	20.4	-2.1
Conservative	1	▲1	3.4	0	1	1.2	25,829	18.4	+10.4
Yorkshire	0	Steady	0.0	0	0	0.0	1,265	0.9	-0.4
Reform	0	Steady	0.0	0	0	0.0	1,040	0.7	N/A
TUSC	0	Steady	0.0	0	0	0.0	859	0.6	+0.5
Independent	0	Steady	0.0	0	0	0.0	842	0.6	+0.5
Women's Equality	0	Steady	0.0	0	0	0.0	290	0.2	-0.1
UKIP	0	▼1	0.0	0	0	0.0	254	0.2	-11.1
SDP	0	Steady	0.0	0	0	0.0	86	0.1	N/A

Three Labour seats had become vacant, and left unfilled since 2019. Michelle Cook (Broomhill & Sharrow Vale) resigned in February 2020, Olivia Blake (Walkley) resigned in March 2020 and Peter Rippon (Richmond) died in December 2020.

The result had the following consequences for the total number of seats on the Council after the elections:

Party	Previous council	New council	+/-
Labour	46	41	▼5
Liberal Democrats	26	29	▲3
Green	8	13	▲5
Conservative	0	1	▲1
Independent	1	0	▼1
Vacant	3	0	▼3
Total	84	84	
Working majority	11	-2	

== Local governance referendum results ==
The local government reform passed, changing the Council model from a cabinet system to a committee system.

2021 Sheffield City Council governance referendum
Choice	Votes	%
Yes	89,670	64.79
No	48,727	35.21
Total	138,397	100.00
Valid votes	138,397	98.72
Invalid/blank votes	1,789	1.28
Total votes	140,186	100.00
Source: Sheffield City Council BBC News

== Ward results ==
* = defending councillor

=== Beauchief & Greenhill ===
Beauchief & Greenhill
Party	Candidate	Votes	%	±%
Liberal Democrats	Sophie Thornton	1,732	33.4	−8.5
Labour	Geoff Cox	1,695	32.7	+4.4
Conservative	Elizabeth Finney	1,070	20.6	+7.8
Green	Graham Marsden	686	13.2	−3.8
Majority		37	0.7	−12.9
Turnout		5,212	36.83	+4.48
Liberal Democrats hold		Swing		

Incumbent Liberal Democrat councillor Bob Pullin did not defend his seat.

=== Beighton ===
Beighton
Party	Candidate	Votes	%	±%
Liberal Democrats	Ann Woolhouse	1,441	33.3	−3.6
Labour	Julie Gledhill	1,399	32.3	+1.8
Conservative	Shirley Clayton	1,089	25.1	+15.1
Green	Anthony Naylor	340	7.8	+1.5
TUSC	Gary Drabble	63	1.5	+1.5
Majority		42	1.0	−5.4
Turnout		4,359	32.23	+3.38
Liberal Democrats gain from Labour		Swing		

Incumbent Labour councillor Sophie Wilson chose to contest Park & Arbourthorne ward.

=== Birley ===
Birley
Party	Candidate	Votes	%	±%
Labour	Bryan Lodge*	1,848	49.5	+8.2
Conservative	Steven Winstone	1,241	33.2	+20.9
Green	Alan Yearsley	437	11.7	−3.4
Liberal Democrats	James Elwood	211	5.6	−1.5
Majority		607	16.2	−1.0
Turnout		3,758	29.39	+3.65
Labour hold		Swing		

=== Broomhill & Sharrow Vale ===
Broomhill & Sharrow Vale
Party	Candidate	Votes	%	±%
Green	Brian Holmshaw	2,653	43.5	−15.0
Labour	Alison Norris	2,576	42.2	+14.3
Conservative	Thomas Oulton	436	7.1	+3.3
Liberal Democrats	Tom Parkin	326	5.3	−1.7
TUSC	Richard Foster	112	1.8	N/A
Majority		77	1.3	−30.3
Turnout		6,135	29.99	+1.32
Green gain from Labour		Swing		

=== Burngreave ===
Burngreave
Party	Candidate	Votes	%	±%
Labour	Safiya Saeed	2,576	65.4	−3.0
Green	Mustafa Ahmed	425	10.8	−1.1
Conservative	Khalil Richard	414	10.5	+6.5
Liberal Democrats	Mary Aston	169	4.3	−1.0
Independent	James Jamison	163	4.1	N/A
Yorkshire	Alex Martin	101	2.6	N/A
UKIP	Shane Harper	89	2.3	−8.1
Majority		2151	54.6	−1.9
Turnout		3,962	26.97	−0.82
Labour hold		Swing		

Incumbent Labour councillor Jackie Drayton did not defend her seat.

=== City ===
City
Party	Candidate	Votes	%	±%
Green	Douglas Johnson*	1,230	54.0	−8.5
Labour	Matthew Dwyer	796	35.0	+7.1
Conservative	Edward Higgins	168	7.4	+2.1
Liberal Democrats	Hashim Mahroof	82	3.6	−0.7
Majority		434	19.1	−15.5
Turnout		2,293	17.74	+3.38
Green hold		Swing		

=== Crookes & Crosspool ===
Crookes & Crosspool
Party	Candidate	Votes	%	±%
Labour	Ruth Milsom	2,602	37.3	+11.8
Liberal Democrats	Bex Atkinson	2,294	32.9	−5.7
Green	Rebecca Mulvaney	1,332	19.1	−6.0
Conservative	Brightmore Kunaka	629	9.0	+3.4
Yorkshire	Gareth O'Shanks	123	1.8	N/A
Majority		308	4.4	N/A
Turnout		7,025	46.69	+5.99
Labour hold		Swing		

Incumbent Labour councillor Anne Murphy chose to contest Manor Castle ward.

=== Darnall ===
Darnall
Party	Candidate	Votes	%	±%
Labour	Mazher Iqbal*	2,078	51.8	−16.2
Liberal Democrats	Adil Mohammed	641	16.0	+9.9
Conservative	Chris Pitchfork	631	15.7	+7.5
Green	Joydu Al-Mahfuz	203	5.1	±0.0
TUSC	Diane Spencer	132	3.3	N/A
Majority		1,437	35.8	−19.4
Turnout		3,719	27.04	+0.49
Labour hold		Swing		

=== Dore & Totley ===
Dore & Totley
Party	Candidate	Votes	%	±%
Liberal Democrats	Colin Ross*	3,697	47.9	−9.4
Conservative	Sara Chinchen	1,997	25.9	+10.7
Labour	Samantha Nicholson	1,066	13.8	+2.2
Green	Dave Applebaum	959	12.4	−3.6
Majority		1,700	22.0	−19.3
Turnout		7,745	52.01	+6.55
Liberal Democrats hold		Swing		

=== East Ecclesfield ===
East Ecclesfield
Party	Candidate	Votes	%	±%
Liberal Democrats	Alan Woodcock	1,498	31.0	−0.1
Labour	Andy Bainbridge*	1,478	30.6	+4.5
Conservative	Adam Allcroft	1,344	27.8	+20.1
Yorkshire	Alex Robertson	264	5.5	−0.4
Green	Abigail Stephenson	244	5.1	−1.1
Majority		20	0.4	−4.6
Turnout		4,845	34.62	+3.62
Liberal Democrats gain from Labour		Swing		

=== Ecclesall ===
Ecclesall
Party	Candidate	Votes	%	±%
Liberal Democrats	Roger Davison*	2,904	34.1	−9.6
Labour	Zoë Sykes	2,168	25.5	+6.7
Green	Jason Leman	2,116	24.8	−0.4
Conservative	Gordon Millward	1,044	12.3	+5.2
Women's Equality	Christine Rose	200	2.3	−1.3
SDP	Andrew Cowell	86	1.0	N/A
Majority		736	8.6	−9.9
Turnout		8,553	53.84	+4.52
Liberal Democrats hold		Swing		

=== Firth Park ===
Firth Park
Party	Candidate	Votes	%	±%
Labour	Alan Law*	1,896	56.7	+5.5
Conservative	Steve Toone	810	24.2	+9.5
Green	Marieanne Elliot	327	9.8	−15.5
Independent	April Worral	157	4.7	N/A
Liberal Democrats	Ann Kingdom	153	4.6	−4.2
Majority		1,086	32.5	+6.7
Turnout		3,367	23.46	+1.32
Labour hold		Swing		

=== Fulwood ===
Fulwood
Party	Candidate	Votes	%	±%
Liberal Democrats	Sue Alston*	3,212	46.6	−7.8
Labour	Jackie Kennedy	1,510	21.9	+8.9
Green	Nathan Strathdee	1,170	17.0	−3.8
Conservative	Christine Saunders	1,000	14.5	+6.3
Majority		1,702	24.7	−8.9
Turnout		6,931	48.49	+3.24
Liberal Democrats hold		Swing		

=== Gleadless Valley ===
Gleadless Valley
Party	Candidate	Votes	%	±%
Green	Alexi Dimond	2,480	46.0	−3.8
Labour	Janet Ridler	1,995	37.0	+5.4
Conservative	Andrew Mustoe	569	10.6	+6.6
Liberal Democrats	John Dryden	241	4.5	−0.6
TUSC	Becky Payne	104	1.9	N/A
Majority		525	9.0	=9.2
Turnout		5,373	39.07	+1.71
Green gain from Labour		Swing		

Incumbent Labour councillor Lewis Dagnall did not defend his seat.

=== Graves Park ===
Graves Park
Party	Candidate	Votes	%	±%
Liberal Democrats	Ian Auckland*	2,357	39.2	−6.6
Labour	Edd Mustill	1,815	30.2	+9.6
Green	Lucy Critchlow	1,168	19.4	−0.2
Conservative	Seun Ajao	677	11.3	+5.6
Majority		542	9.0	−16.3
Turnout		6,050	44.91	+4.61
Liberal Democrats hold		Swing		

=== Hillsborough ===
Hillsborough
Party	Candidate	Votes	%	±%
Green	Christine Kubo	2,337	41.4	+16.1
Labour	Bob Johnson*	2,013	35.6	−1.7
Conservative	Lesley Blyth	906	16.0	+8.1
Liberal Democrats	Will Sapwell	314	5.6	−7.8
TUSC	Adam Calvert	80	1.4	N/A
Majority		324	5.8	N/A
Turnout		5,679	38.52	+7.85
Green gain from Labour		Swing		

=== Manor Castle ===
Manor Castle
Party	Candidate	Votes	%	±%
Labour	Anne Murphy**	1,567	48.6	+6.2
Green	Ruth Flagg-Abbey	642	19.9	+1.8
Conservative	Ian Walker	578	17.9	+12.5
Yorkshire	Jack Carrington	303	9.4	−3.8
Liberal Democrats	Stephanie Kenning	134	4.2	±0.0
TUSC	Alistair Tice	104	3.2	N/A
Majority		925	28.7	+4.4
Turnout		3,338	22.32	+0.81
Labour hold		Swing		

Anne Murphy was a sitting councillor in Crookes & Crosspool.

=== Mosborough ===
Mosborough
Party	Candidate	Votes	%	±%
Labour	Tony Downing*	1,964	40.0	+10.6
Liberal Democrats	Kurtis Crossland	1,744	35.5	−2.2
Conservative	Mark Finney	892	18.2	+11.1
Green	Julie White	220	4.5	−1.0
Reform	Adam Wood	89	1.8	−10.4
Majority		220	4.5	N/A
Turnout		4,923	35.97	+5.72
Labour hold		Swing		

=== Nether Edge & Sharrow ===
Nether Edge & Sharrow
Party	Candidate	Votes	%	±%
Green	Maroof Raouf	3,102	48.8	−7.4
Labour	Gareth Slater	2,200	34.6	±0.0
Conservative	John Chapman	533	8.7	+5.7
Liberal Democrats	Patricia White	385	6.1	+1.0
TUSC	Holly Johnson	192	3.0	N/A
Yorkshire	John Kennedy	122	1.9	N/A
Majority		902	14.2	−7.4
Turnout		6,595	40.17	−3.88
Green gain from Labour		Swing		

Incumbent Labour councillor James Steinke did not defend his seat.

=== Park & Arbourthorne ===
Park & Arbourthorne
Party	Candidate	Votes	%	±%
Labour	Sophie Wilson**	1,860	49.3	+11.1
Conservative	Richard Blyth	1,051	27.9	+17.8
Green	Dave Dillner	572	15.2	+1.1
Liberal Democrats	Phil Shaddock	288	7.6	−0.6
Majority		809	21.4	+4.6
Turnout		3,800	28.37	+4.27
Labour hold		Swing		

Sophie Wilson was a sitting councillor in Beighton.

=== Richmond ===
Richmond
Party	Candidate	Votes	%	±%
Labour	David Barker	1,828	49.2	+4.9
Labour	Mike Drabble*	1,378	37.1	−7.2
Conservative	Claire Lord	995	26.8	+13.9
Conservative	Dean O'Brien	926	24.9	+12.0
Green	Catherine Hartley	513	13.8	+1.2
Reform	Robert Burns	408	11.0	N/A
Reform	Brian Kus	387	10.4	−14.0
Green	Eamonn Ward	277	7.4	−4.6
Liberal Democrats	Susan Ross	163	4.4	−1.4
Liberal Democrats	Eilidh Pattie	129	3.5	−2.3
Majority		383	10.3	−9.6
Turnout		3,721	27.63	+4.18
Labour hold		Swing		

There were two seats elected due to a vacancy resulting from the death of Labour councillor Peter Rippon a year earlier. Polling the highest number of votes, David Barker won the three-year term (reduced from four years due to the delayed elections), and Mike Drabble won the two-year term (reduced from three years).

=== Shiregreen & Brightside ===
Shiregreen & Brightside
Party	Candidate	Votes	%	±%
Labour	Peter Price*	1,803	54.5	+9.9
Conservative	Zoe Steane	991	30.0	+21.4
Green	Milton Pennefather	310	9.4	+0.1
Liberal Democrats	Diane Leek	204	6.2	+0.8
Majority		812	24.5	+12.0
Turnout		3,328	23.92	+1.84
Labour hold		Swing		

=== Southey ===
Southey
Party	Candidate	Votes	%	±%
Labour	Tony Damms*	1,745	54.5	+8.7
Conservative	Antony May	800	25.0	+18.3
Green	Andrew Hards	374	11.7	−0.8
Liberal Democrats	Rob Reiss	150	4.7	−1.6
Reform	Mick Lee	134	4.2	N/A
Majority		945	29.5	+12.4
Turnout		3,222	22.95	+1.97
Labour hold		Swing		

=== Stannington ===
Stannington
Party	Candidate	Votes	%	±%
Liberal Democrats	Richard Williams	1,900	31.7	−14.5
Labour	Craig Gamble-Pugh	1,737	29.0	+11.3
Conservative	Luke Liddle	1,486	24.8	+16.3
Green	Callum Sweet	710	11.8	−2.7
UKIP	Michael Virgo	165	2.8	−10.4
Majority		163	2.7	−15.8
Turnout		6,021	41.55	+5.80
Liberal Democrats hold		Swing		

Incumbent Liberal Democrat councillor David Baker did not defend his seat.

=== Stocksbridge & Upper Don ===
Stocksbridge & Upper Don
Party	Candidate	Votes	%	±%
Conservative	Lewis Chinchen	1,822	32.2	+18.8
Labour	Lisa Banes	1,325	23.4	−11.5
Liberal Democrats	Martin Brelsford	1,317	23.3	+12.0
Green	David Willington	596	10.5	−1.5
Independent	Jack Clarkson*	522	9.2	N/A
Reform	Danny Davies	78	1.4	N/A
Majority		497	8.8	N/A
Turnout		5,692	39.01	+4.68
Conservative gain from UKIP		Swing		

Jack Clarkson was originally elected for UKIP.

=== Walkley ===
Walkley
Party	Candidate	Votes	%	±%
Green	Bernard Little	2,774	46.0	+11.1
Labour	Fran Belbin	2,290	38.0	+2.3
Conservative	Eve Millward	592	9.8	+5.8
Liberal Democrats	Irshad Akbar	213	3.5	−10.7
Women's Equality	Ann Butler	90	1.5	±0.0
TUSC	Joe Hibbert	72	1.2	N/A
Majority		484	8.0	N/A
Turnout		6,061	38.50	+10.0
Green gain from Labour		Swing		

The Walkley seat was vacant since the Labour councillor Olivia Blake stood down after being elected to Parliament in 2019.

=== West Ecclesfield ===
West Ecclesfield
Party	Candidate	Votes	%	±%
Liberal Democrats	Ann Whitaker	1,752	35.4	−1.9
Labour	Adam Hurst*	1,361	27.5	+7.7
Conservative	Kevin Mahoney	889	18.0	+12.3
Yorkshire	Jonathan Ogle	352	7.1	N/A
Reform	John Booker	331	6.7	−21.9
Green	Kathy Aston	266	5.4	−3.1
Majority		391	7.9	−0.8
Turnout		4,973	36.43	+3.38
Liberal Democrats gain from Labour		Swing		

=== Woodhouse ===
Woodhouse
Party	Candidate	Votes	%	±%
Labour	Mick Rooney*	2,106	55.3	+15.4
Conservative	Gordon Gregory	1,155	30.3	+18.7
Green	Liam Hardy	337	8.8	−6.7
Liberal Democrats	Phil Edwardson	213	5.6	±0.0
Majority		951	25.0	+12.5
Turnout		3,831	28.98	+3.20
Labour hold		Swing		

== By-elections ==
=== Firth Park ===
Firth Park: 16 September 2021
Party	Candidate	Votes	%	±%
Labour Co-op	Fran Belbin	1,091	40.2	−16.5
Liberal Democrats	Irshad Akbar	1,050	38.7	+34.1
Conservative	Steve Toone	258	9.5	−14.7
Green	Marieanne Elliot	162	6.0	−3.8
Independent	April Worrall	155	5.7	+1.0
Majority		41	1.5	−31.0
Turnout		2,716	19.12	−4.34
Labour Co-op hold		Swing		
