= Jonathan Arnott =

Brexit Party politician (born 1981)

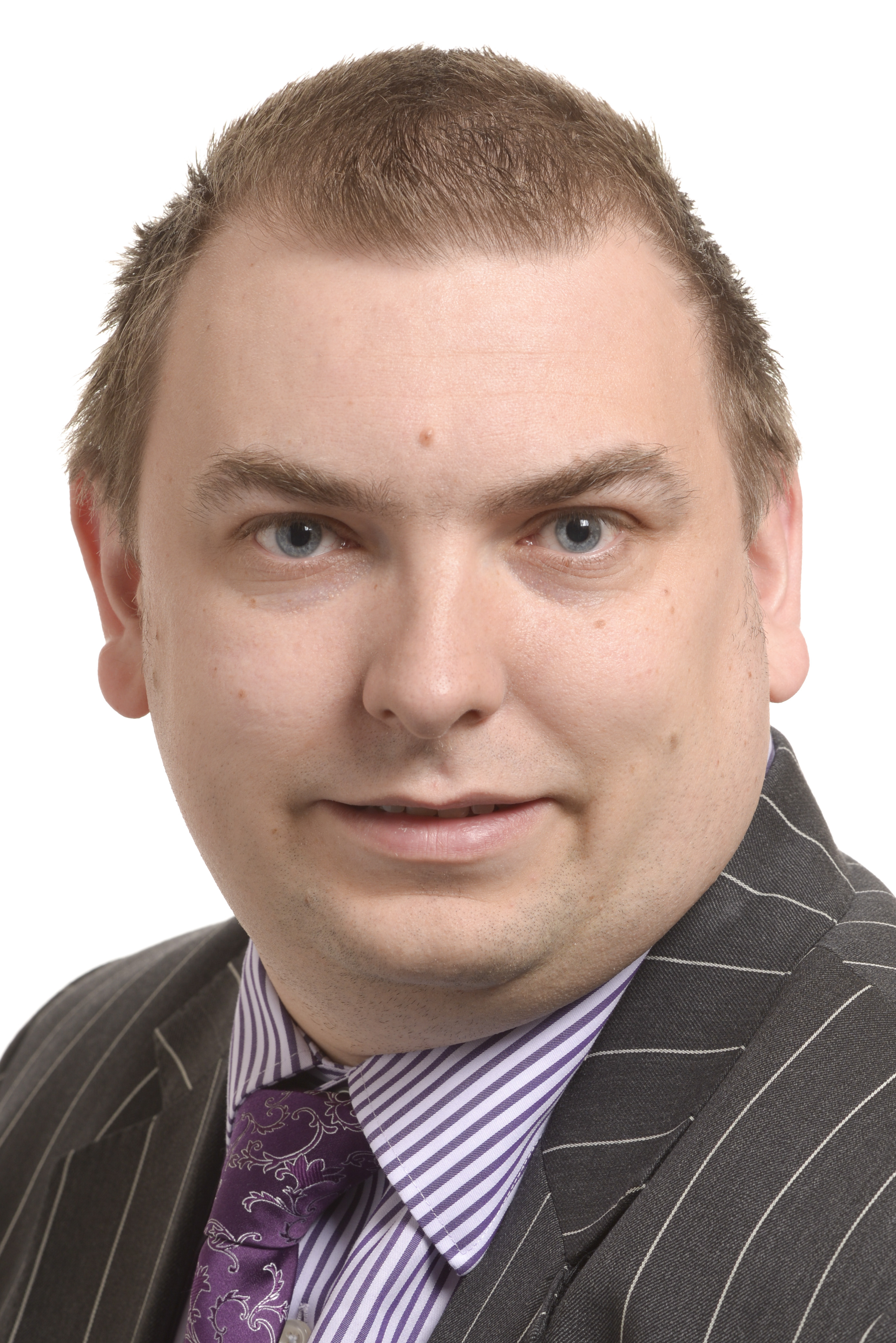
- Official portrait, 2014

Special Political Advisor for the Leader of the UK Independence Party
- In office 18 October 2017 – 19 January 2018
- Leader: Henry Bolton
- Preceded by: Patrick O'Flynn
- Succeeded by: Tommy Robinson

UKIP Spokesperson for Europe
- In office 24 July 2014 – 9 June 2017
- Leader: Nigel Farage; Diane James; Nigel Farage (Acting); Paul Nuttall
- Preceded by: Position established
- Succeeded by: Gerard Batten (DExEU)

General Secretary of the UK Independence Party
- In office 8 September 2008 – August 2014
- Preceded by: Geoffrey Kingscott
- Succeeded by: Roger Bird

Member of the European Parliament for North East England
- In office 1 July 2014 – 1 July 2019
- Preceded by: Martin Callanan
- Succeeded by: Brian Monteith

Personal details
- Born: 12 January 1981 (age 45) Sheffield, South Yorkshire, England
- Party: Brexit Party; Independent (until 17 April 2019); UK Independence Party (until 19 January 2018)
- Education: University of Sheffield
- Website: www.jonathanarnott.co.uk
- Chess career
- Country: England
- Title: Candidate Master (2011)
- Peak rating: 2191 (November 2011)

Jonathan William Arnott (born 12 January 1981) is a British politician and former schoolteacher. Following the 2014 European Parliament election, he served as a Member of the European Parliament (MEP) for the North East England region. Originally sitting as a UK Independence Party (UKIP) representative, he resigned from the party on 19 January 2018 to sit as an independent until designating as Brexit Party on 17 April 2019.

== Early life and career ==
Arnott was born in Sheffield. At the age of 15 he enrolled at the University of Sheffield, graduating with a MMath in mathematics.

Arnott was a teacher of Mathematics at Handsworth Christian School. He is known for his belief that those in politics should keep doing a real-world job, and therefore he continued to teach on a part-time basis until his election as an MEP.

== Political career ==
Arnott joined UKIP in 2001, and stood in the 2004 and 2009 European elections, being the party's No.2 list candidate in the Yorkshire and the Humber region on both occasions. Until 2008 he was the part-time local elections co-ordinator for the party, working with 300 candidates to increase the number of UKIP councillors. At the 2008 UKIP conference, Arnott was unveiled as the new party General Secretary. Arnott resigned as General Secretary—after six years in the position—in August 2014.

=== UKIP leadership bid ===
In July 2016, Arnott launched his bid to become leader of UKIP following the resignation of Nigel Farage. He gained the support of Yorkshire and the Humber MEP's Jane Collins and Mike Hookem. Arnott said he wanted to appeal to the millions of voters who did not support UKIP in the previous year's general election but backed Brexit in the EU referendum. He withdrew from the contest in August, acknowledging he couldn't win and saying he refused to be controversial just to grab headlines.

=== 2017 leadership election ===
During the 2017 UKIP leadership election Arnott repeatedly warned that far-right entryists had signed up as members of UKIP in an attempt to take over the party by electing Anne Marie Waters as the next leader. He said that UKIP would be on the verge of dying if this attempt was not thwarted and said that he "could not under any circumstances support Anne Marie Waters".

=== General elections ===
In the general election of 2005 he stood as a UKIP candidate for the Sheffield Attercliffe constituency, coming fourth overall with 4.5% of the vote, losing his deposit. Arnott was then selected to contest the Sheffield South East constituency for the 2010 general election. Just before the election, he took part in the second half of a BBC Radio 5 Live debate on crime with Alan Johnson, Chris Grayling and Chris Huhne. He spoke four times, calling for a reduction in police bureaucracy, abolition of jail sentence remission and rehabilitation of offenders. Arnott came fifth with 4.6% of the vote, losing his deposit but increasing the UKIP vote by 0.2%.

In the 2015 general election, he was the UKIP representative in the BBC Daily Politics Education Debate and in the young people's Newsbeat debate on the economy and housing. He stood for the Easington constituency–the constituency in which he lived–coming second in the safe Labour seat with 18.7% of the vote, ahead of both the Liberal Democrat and Conservative candidates.

Following the 2015 general election, Arnott accused the party of peddling a "toxic message" and "banging on" about immigration which he said lead to "self-inflicted" disappointing results. He also criticised the party's candidate selection process which allowed people with what he called "abhorrent" views to represent the party.

=== 2016 EU referendum ===
Arnott was one of the most vocal internal critics of the infamous UKIP "breaking point" poster that was unveiled in the run-up to the 2016 EU referendum. He described this as "dog-whistle politics".

He said it was "heartbreaking" that on the campaign trail he had to plead with people who perceived the poster as racist not to abandon their intention to vote Leave. He believed this poster lost a lot of votes for the Leave campaign.

=== Local elections ===
In the 2011 local elections Arnott came second in the Woodhouse ward with 13.1% of the vote, behind the Labour party with 62.9%. He then led UKIP in the 2012 local elections, the party coming fourth overall with 10.25% of votes, up from 1.6% in the comparable 2008 local elections. Arnott himself finished second in Woodhouse ward with 22.1%, behind the Labour party with 60.2% of votes.

=== Police and Crime Commissioner election ===
On 12 October 2012, Arnott was announced as the UKIP candidate for the Police and Crime Commissioner elections in South Yorkshire coming fourth with 11.54% of the vote.

=== European Parliament ===
On 25 May 2014, it was announced that Arnott had been elected as UKIP's first ever MEP for North East England. Arnott used his acceptance speech on election night to highlight what he described as an election campaign that had been "marred by a campaign of hate, waged against UKIP by those who fear a realignment of British politics".

Following Arnott's election to the European Parliament, it was announced that he was to represent the Europe of Freedom and Direct Democracy group on both the Committee on Budgets and the Budgetary Control Committee. Arnott's maiden speech was in Strasbourg in a debate on youth unemployment, where he highlighted how the North East of England had the highest rate of youth unemployment in the UK, with at least one in four young people unemployed. In the speech, he criticised Labour's support of the EU's flagship 'youth guarantee scheme' labelling it as a 'guaranteed failure'; highlighting previous criticisms from the International Labour Organisation.

Since his election Arnott has made more speeches in the European Parliament than any other British MEP. At 97.23% his Parliamentary voting record is substantially higher than that of all other UKIP MEPs, although he also votes against the Party whip more than any other UKIP MEP.

On 1 March 2018 Arnott was one of three UK MEPs who voted against a motion to encourage national parliaments to ban "gay conversion therapies".

=== Britain Beyond Brexit ===
In June 2017 Arnott published a document called 'Britain Beyond Brexit' which sets out an alternative policy platform and vision for the future of UKIP. This document was a radical departure from the 2017 UKIP manifesto.

=== Resignation as General Secretary and Constitutional Affairs spokesman ===
In 2017 UKIP revealed a new 'integration agenda' which proposed the banning of Muslim face-coverings in public, disbanding Sharia councils and physical checks on young girls believed to be at risk of female genital mutilation.

Arnott stated that he had watched recent events with "disappointment, bordering on despair" and warned that the party was heading in a "bland and anti-Muslim" direction. He said that "hardline anti-Islam nonsense" and the "crass" integration agenda made it very difficult for people to vote UKIP.

On 9 June he resigned as General Secretary and Constitutional Affairs spokesman.

=== Resignation from UKIP ===
On 19 January 2018, Arnott announced his resignation from UKIP. In his resignation letter, he stated that he had lost confidence in UKIP leader Henry Bolton, who he felt was "not the right person for the job" - but thought no better of those "jockeying" for position in the party. He added that UKIP had "shifted" its stance on religious and cultural issues to a degree he could not support.

In April 2019, Arnott announced that he would not be standing for re-election as an MEP at the 2019 European Parliament elections, though he stated that he would be supporting the Brexit Party at that election.

== Personal life ==
Arnott is a chess enthusiast who is a Candidate Master, former member of the England Under-21 squad and captained the Yorkshire county side from 2002 to 2004. He regularly competes in the 4NCL international chess league and the Gibraltar International chess festival. He represented White Rose in the European Club Cup in 2010 and 2011, with the team finishing as the top British side by 20 places in 2011. His highest rating of 2191 was achieved in 2012 and his rating of 2173 in July 2015 ranks him 169th in England and 12281 in the world.

He has also represented Great Britain at the board game Stratego, helping the British team to the bronze medal at the 2012 World Championships. It was reported that he would be competing again in 2015.

For the past 15 years, Arnott has been part of a team on Scunthorpe Hospital Radio, broadcasting the home games of Scunthorpe United.

== Bibliography ==
- Arnott, Jonathan (12 May 2014). Chess: Skills - Tactics - Techniques. Crowood Press Ltd. ISBN 978-1847977052.
- Arnott, Jonathan (25 April 2016). The Blueprint: Our Future After Brexit. Vista Publishing. ISBN 978-0955809194.
- Arnott, Jonathan (14 January 2019). How Politicians Are Ruining Brexit. Steel City Press. ISBN 978-1913047009.

Party political offices
Preceded by Geoffrey Kingscott	General Secretary of the UK Independence Party; 2008–2014	Succeeded by Roger Bird
New post	UKIP Spokesperson for Europe; 2014–2017	Succeeded by Gerard Batten
Preceded by Henry Bolton	Special Political Advisor for the Leader of the UK Independence Party; 2017–2018	Succeeded by Tommy Robinson
European Parliament
Preceded by Martin Callanan	Member of the European Parliament for North East England; 2014–2019	Next: Brian Monteith
