= Désirée Reynolds =

British Jamaican writer, journalist and curator

- Born: Clapham, London, England
- Education: University of Sheffield
- Occupations: Writer, curator, journalist
- Writing career
- Period: 2005–
- Genres: Poetry, plays, fiction, novel, short story, journalism
- Subjects: Black British people, Jamaican people, anti-racism, immigrants, women
- Notable work: Seduce
- Website: desireereynolds.co.uk

Désirée Reynolds is a British writer, curator, disc jockey, and journalist living in Sheffield, England. She is currently artist in residence at Sheffield City Archives. The daughter of Jamaican parents, Reynolds was raised in Clapham, London, and moved to Sheffield as a student. She began her writing career working for The Jamaica Gleaner and The Village Voice. Reynolds has published several short stories and a novel, Seduce (Leeds: Peepal Tree Press, 2013). She is the creative director for Dig Where You Stand, an archival justice project in South Yorkshire.

== Career ==
Reynolds first told her mother she wanted to write when she was eight years old. She developed an interest in history after learning about the exploitation of Sarah Baartman, a Khoekhoe woman exhibited as the "Hottentot Venus", in European freak shows.

=== Sheffield Community Radio ===
In 1996, while she was in her early 20s, Reynolds moved to South Yorkshire to study first English and then cultural studies at the University of Sheffield, and has lived and worked there since. After living with a family friend for several months, she moved out and became a DJ on pirate radio station Sheffield Community Radio, playing hip-hop, R&B and jungle music. After she became pregnant, Reynolds stopped DJing—which had involved carrying her records to various "stinky and skanky" high rise flats—but continued to write.

=== Writing ===
Reynolds began her writing career as a journalist for The Jamaica Gleaner and The Village Voice. In 2012, she took part in a writer development programme at Peepal Tree Press in Leeds, publishing her first novel Seduce with them a year later.

In 2018, Reynolds edited Talk About Change: Writing As Resistance, an anthology exploring diversity, feminism, immigration, and race, as part of a University of Sheffield-funded collaboration with the Festival of the Mind, local social enterprise Our Mel, and the Linguistic DNA project. Later that year, she received a Developing Your Own Practice award from Arts Council England, to support the writing of new work—including a novel about the collapse of a Haitian plantation, as well as a short story about Sarah Baartman's brief stay in Manchester in 1811.

In 2021, Reynolds was longlisted for the BBC Short Story Prize. In 2024, Tyke Films and the BFI Network produced a 12-minute adaptation of Reynolds' story "Born on Sunday, Silent", directed by Eelyn Lee. The film is based on the true story of a baby, Kai Akosua Mansah, who was born and died in Sheffield in 1902.

=== Curation ===
From 2020, Reynolds was guest curator for Off the Shelf Festival of Words. She organised the festival's Black Women Write Now strand until 2022, programming events with authors such as Kit de Waal and Candice Braithwaite.

In 2021, Reynolds became writer in residence at Sheffield City Archives. After finding there was little Black history on display at Sheffield City Archives, she founded the archival justice project Dig Where You Stand (DWYS), which explores the pre-1945 history of Black British people in South Yorkshire. In collaboration with the archives, the Centre for Equity and Inclusion at the University of Sheffield, and brand agency Peter & Paul, DWYS runs a biennial festival of free exhibitions and events across the city. After the project's first exhibition, it received funding from the National Lottery Heritage to commission 14 local artists to respond to the archives, including Rosamaria Cisneros, Seiko Kinoshita, Otis Mensah, Wemmy Ogunyankin, and others.

In 2023, Reynolds curated Black Ink: When Trouble Come Ink Haffi Run for the Black Cultural Archives. In 2024, Reynolds curated the DWYS exhibition Fractured in Rotherham, which documented the town's Black Georgian history. Reynolds said that records at Wentworth Woodhouse showed that a Black man, Thomas Blake, had worked at the house from 1721, indicating Black people had worked there at least four years earlier than previously believed.

Reynolds has also hosted events for the Festival of Debate, interviewing subjects such as Gloria Steinem and Sathnam Sanghera.

== Reception ==
In its review of The Book of Sheffield, Wasafiri said Reynolds' short story "Born on Sunday, Silent" was a "powerful story of the unmarked grave of an African child dating from the early 1900s, and the city’s shameful collusion in a racist and imperial past". Writing in The Guardian, Kadish Morris describes Seduce as "a hurricane of a book that pulsates with love, sex, shame, class and religion".

== Publications ==
=== As editor ===
- Talk About Change: Writing as Resistance (as editor), edited by Désirée Reynolds (University of Sheffield, 2018)

=== Novels ===
- Seduce (Leeds: Peepal Tree Press, 2013)

=== Poetry ===
- HAIR: A Journey Into the Afro & Asian Experience (Manchester: Suitcase Press, 2006)
- The Suitcase Book of Love Poems, edited by Martin de Mello (Manchester: Suitcase Press, 2008)

=== Short stories ===
- "Unconditional Love" in Moss Side Stories, edited by Martin de Mello (Manchester: Crocus Books, 2012)
- Closure: Contemporary Black British Short Stories, edited by Jacob Ross (Leeds: Peepal Tree, 2015)
- Elevator Fiction: micro narratives under 500 words by 30 BAME writers (Manchester: Crocus Books, 2016)
- "Born on Sunday Silent" in The Book of Sheffield: A City in Short Fiction, edited by Catherine Taylor (Manchester: Comma Press, 2019)
- "Runway Flower" in Where We Find Ourselves: Poems and Stories of Maps and Mapping from UK writers of the global majority, edited by Sandra Agard and Laila Sumpton (London: Arachne Press, 2021)
- Test Signal: A Northern Anthology of New Writing, edited by Nathan Connolly (Liverpool/London: Dead Ink and Bloomsbury, 2022)
- Collision: Stories from the Science of CERN, edited by Ron Appleby and Connie Potter (Manchester: Comma Press, 2023)

=== Life writing ===
- Tangled Roots, edited by Dr. Katy Massey (Leeds, 2013).
