= Olivia Blake =

British politician (born 1990)

The Honourable Olivia Blake MP
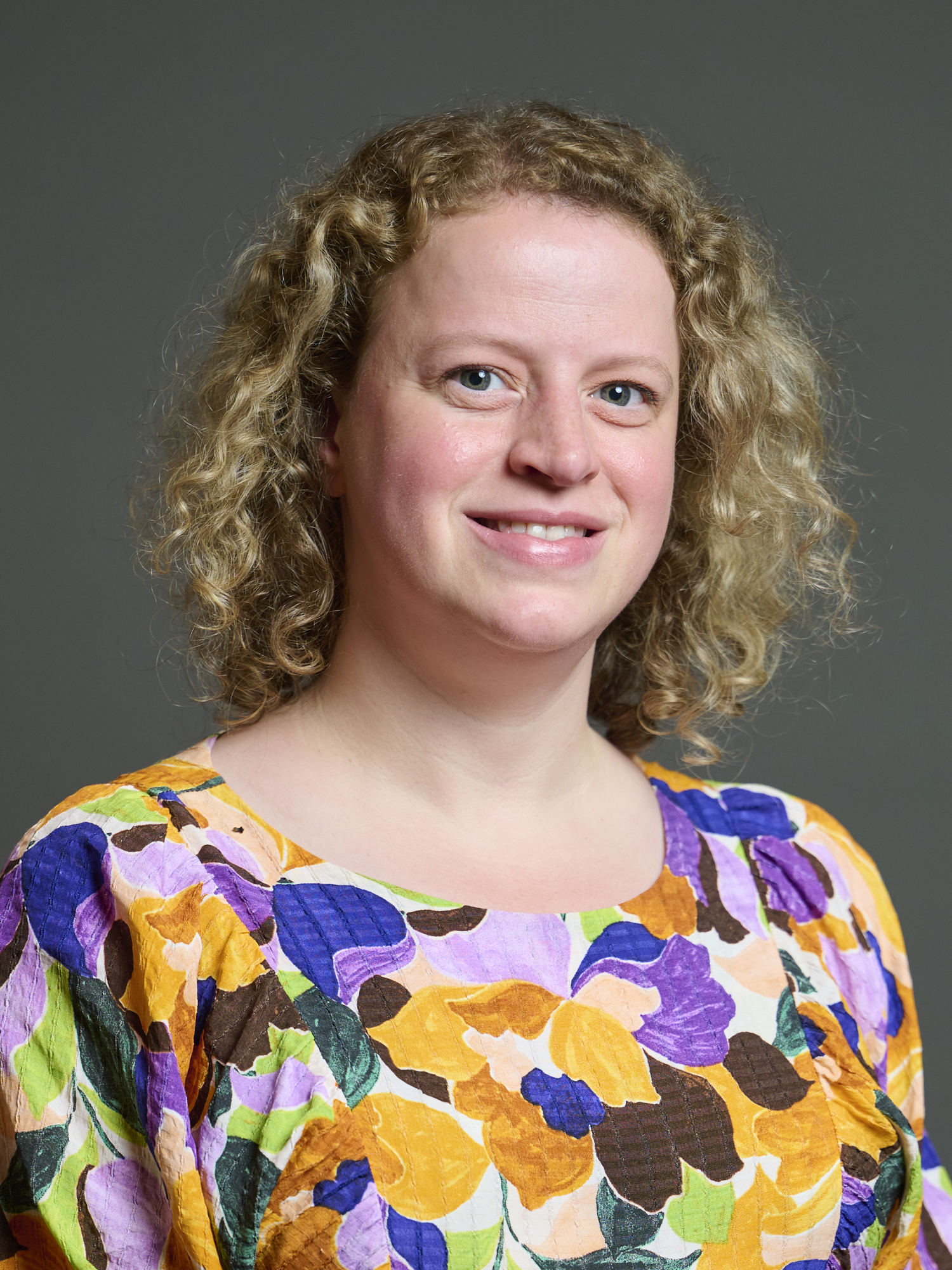
- Official portrait, 2024

Member of Parliament for Sheffield Hallam
- Incumbent
- Assumed office 12 December 2019
- Preceded by: Jared O'Mara
- Majority: 8,981 (15.9%)
Shadow portfolios
2021–2022	Climate Change
2021–2021	Nature, Water and Flooding

Deputy Leader of Sheffield City Council
- In office 5 April 2017 – 23 August 2019
- Leader: Julie Dore
- Preceded by: Leigh Bramall
- Succeeded by: Terry Fox

Member of Sheffield City Council for Walkley
- In office 22 May 2014 – 2 March 2020
- Preceded by: Nikki Sharpe
- Succeeded by: Bernard Little

Personal details
- Born: Olivia Frances Blake; 10 March 1990 (age 36) Northallerton, North Yorkshire, England
- Party: Labour
- Other political affiliations: Socialist Campaign Group
- Spouse: Lewis Dagnall
- Parent: Judith Blake (mother)
- Education: University of Sheffield
- Website: www.oliviablake.org.uk

Olivia Frances Blake-Dagnall (born 10 March 1990) is a British Labour politician who has been the Member of Parliament (MP) for Sheffield Hallam since 2019.

== Early life and education ==
Olivia Blake was born on 10 March 1990 in Northallerton, North Yorkshire. She grew up in Otley, West Yorkshire, and was educated at Prince Henry's Grammar School, the local comprehensive school. She then studied Biomedical Science at the University of Sheffield.

== Political career ==
=== Offices within the Labour Party (2013–present) ===
In 2013, Blake stood in the election for the Youth Representative on Labour's National Executive Committee and came second. She campaigned to introduce 'one member one vote' elections for internal positions and was supported by the Labour Party's left-wing.

In 2018, Blake was elected to Labour's National Policy Forum with the endorsement of the left-wing groups Momentum and the Centre-Left Grassroots Alliance.

=== Sheffield City Councillor (2014–2020) ===
Blake unsuccessfully stood in the 2 May 2013 by-election for the Fulwood ward of Sheffield City Council before being elected as a local councillor to the Walkley ward of Sheffield City Council in 2014, 2015 and 2016.

Blake was elected Deputy Leader of the Council in April 2017. Blake said she was elected as Deputy Leader "on a ticket of reform", and worked to in-source council contracts and tackle privatisation. As Deputy Leader, the Council brought its Revenues and Benefits services in-house from outsourcing giant Capita; Blake said that "bringing these services back in-house" would give the Council "greater control and allow [it] to adapt and respond as the city's priorities develop locally". Before she left her position Blake initiated the process to bring "digital services and cleaning contracts" in-house. She also supported a campaign to initiate a pilot scheme of universal basic income in Sheffield.

Blake later resigned as Deputy Leader to support a grassroots movement to change the democratic structure of the council, remaining as a councillor. She later resigned from the Council following her election as an MP. In an article she wrote for Tribune magazine, Blake said this was to show support for "a new way of doing politics in our city". She indicated that she intends to "contribute a socialist voice to the referendum debate", to open up a "wider discussion on how to rejuvenate our democracy in Sheffield."

Blake supported Britain remaining in the European Union, saying in November 2019 that she would campaign to remain in a potential second referendum on the issue.

== Parliamentary career ==
Blake was selected as the prospective Labour Party candidate for Sheffield Hallam in December 2018. At the 2019 General Election, Blake was elected to Parliament as MP for Sheffield Hallam with 34.6% of the vote and a majority of 712. In her maiden speech to Parliament, Blake said that the Sheffield Hallam constituency had a "very long history of social justice", as Robin Hood mythology points to a Yorkshire origin in Loxley. She said that Robin of Loxley means she was "not the first person in Sheffield Hallam to stand on a platform of redistributing wealth".

Upon her election to Parliament, Blake joined the Socialist Campaign Group, a left-wing grouping of Labour Party Members of Parliament in the House of Commons of the United Kingdom.

She nominated Rebecca Long-Bailey in the 2020 Labour Party leadership election and Angela Rayner in the 2020 Labour Party deputy leadership election.

In February 2020, Blake was elected as the Treasurer of the All-Party Parliamentary Group on Myalgic Encephalomyelitis (ME). She was elected to Parliament's Public Accounts Committee in March 2020.

Following the election of Keir Starmer, she was appointed in April 2020 as the Parliamentary Private Secretary (PPS) jointly to Jo Stevens, Shadow Secretary of State for Digital, Culture, Media and Sport, and Ian Murray, Shadow Secretary of State for Scotland.

Blake is vice-chair of the Bakers, Food and Allied Workers' Union Parliamentary Group.

After Wetherspoons' owner Tim Martin was inaccurately reported to have told his 43,000 employees that they would not be furloughed during the COVID-19 pandemic, and should go work at Tesco, Blake, as vice-chair of the BFAWU Parliamentary Group, coordinated a cross-party letter of 95 MPs to calling on Martin to "put people and not profits first" and continue to pay Wetherspoons workers.

Since 2020, Blake has served as the Chair of the SEND APPG.

Blake was forced to resign from her position as PPS to Jo Stevens and Ian Murray in September 2020 when she, alongside 18 other Labour MPs, including two other junior office holders, Beth Winter and Nadia Whittome, defied the Labour whip and voted against the Overseas Operations Bill.

In January 2021, Blake launched a series of monthly climate assemblies in the run-up to COP 26. From these assemblies, Blake created the Hallam Citizens' Climate Manifesto, informed by constituents' contributions in the assemblies. She launched the manifesto in October 2021, with a launch in Sheffield and by handing in a copy of the manifesto at 10 Downing Street.

On 14 May 2021, Blake was appointed as the Shadow Minister for Nature, Water and Flooding.

In the November 2021 shadow cabinet reshuffle, Blake was moved to serve as the Shadow Minister for Climate Change. She resigned from this role on 15 June 2022, citing personal reasons.

Blake serves as the co-chair for the APPG on Migration, alongside David Simmonds.

In late 2022, households in Stannington ward in Blake's constituency were left without gas for a week in freezing temperatures. Blake stationed members of her constituency team at Lomas Hall in Stannington throughout the incident, and led door-knocking teams to identify vulnerable people in need of support. In the aftermath she urged Yorkshire Water to put their profits towards upgrading their infrastructure. After a meeting with Blake, Yorkshire Water's CEO agreed to support people with any water damage and pay compensation claims.

Blake introduced the Climate and Ecology Bill in May 2023 under the Ten Minute Rule procedure in the House of Commons. The bill seeks to establish binding 'climate and nature targets' for the United Kingdom.

Blake won The Climate Coalition's 2023 Green Heart Hero Award as "MP Constituency Champion" for her work to create a 'greener and more climate friendly Sheffield'. She is credited for meeting with 'her constituents to discuss their climate-related hopes and ambitions and [developing] a Hallam Citizens' Climate Manifesto which she took to Downing Street and COP26 in Glasgow', as well as 'regularly advocating for housing retrofits throughout her constituency, [supporting] local rewilding and [lending] her voice to campaigns against moorland burning.'

Blake was re-elected to Parliament as MP for Sheffield Hallam at the 2024 general election with an increased vote share of 46.3% and an increased majority of 8,189.

== Policies and views ==
Blake is a supporter of a "Green New Deal" for the UK, and passionate about the issue of climate change. Blake has expressed support for improved transport links for Sheffield to address the climate crisis. In 2020, she wrote to the transport secretary asking him to consider the reopening of the Millhouses and Ecclesall station, suggesting it would reduce congestion in the area. Alongside Louise Haigh, Blake has launched a campaign to reopen railway stations along the Sheaf Valley line, seeking to reopen Millhouses and Heeley stations, and increase capability at Dore & Totley.

Blake discussed her experience of having a miscarriage in August 2020 in a parliamentary debate on Baby Loss in November 2020 and called for the three miscarriages rule where support was only offered after this point to be changed. This led to draft guidelines which scrapped this to be produced by the Royal College of Obstetricians and Gynaecologists in October 2021. She also successfully campaigned to allow one partner to be present at all times with pregnant mothers during the pandemic.

In February 2022, Blake spoke in Westminster Hall on a debate on Special Educational Needs and Children's Mental Health Services. She announced that she was diagnosed with ADHD during the previous year, in addition to previous diagnoses of dyslexia and dyspraxia, and that she was prescribed medication. Blake recalled being called "lazy", "distracted" and "in disarray" and criticised the education system's current approach, encouraging support for young people.

In March 2023, Blake tabled an amendment to the Government's Illegal Migration Bill, to create a "safe passage" visa to give entry clearance to those already in Europe wishing to come to the UK to make an asylum claim. Blake said that 'if we want to save lives, ministers need to change their approach, drop the cruel and inhumane deterrence policies, and look at real solutions.'

In July 2023, she backed changes to the Women's Health Strategy for women who have experienced miscarriage alongside Myleene Klass.

In response to the Gaza war, Blake called for Labour to back a ceasefire. On the day of the vote on the King's Speech, where the SNP tabled an amendment calling for a ceasefire, Blake said that she was 'unable to be in Parliament as [she was] undergoing medical treatment in Sheffield', but that her 'position has been consistent and clear: an immediate ceasefire is the only way to halt the horrific loss of life we have seen in recent weeks'; she clarified that if 'I were able to attend... I would absolutely vote for an immediate ceasefire' and that she was 'pained that [she] cannot be there to do so'.

In November 2024, Blake voted in favour of the Terminally Ill Adults (End of Life) Bill, which proposes to legalise assisted suicide.

== Personal life ==
Blake's mother Judith Blake, Baroness Blake of Leeds is a Labour politician who led Leeds City Council from 2015 to 2021.

She is married to Lewis Dagnall, formerly a Sheffield City Councillor, and is bisexual. In June 2025 she revealed on Newsnight that she had once been a punk in her youth.

== Electoral history ==
UK local elections
Date of election	Constituency	Party	Votes	% of votes	Result	Ref.
2013 by-election	Fulwood, Sheffield	Labour	1,035	19.5	Not elected	
2014 local elections	Walkley, Sheffield	Labour	2,061	39.5	Elected	
2015 local elections	Walkley, Sheffield	Labour	4,016	41.5	Elected	
2016 local elections	Walkley, Sheffield	Labour	2,686	49.0	Elected	

UK general elections
Date of election	Constituency	Party	Votes	% of votes	Result	Ref.
2019	Sheffield Hallam	Labour	19,709	34.6	Elected	
2024	Sheffield Hallam	Labour	23,875	46.3	Elected	

Parliament of the United Kingdom
Preceded by Jared O'Mara	Member of Parliament for Sheffield Hallam; 2019–present	Incumbent
