= 2019 Sheffield City Council election =

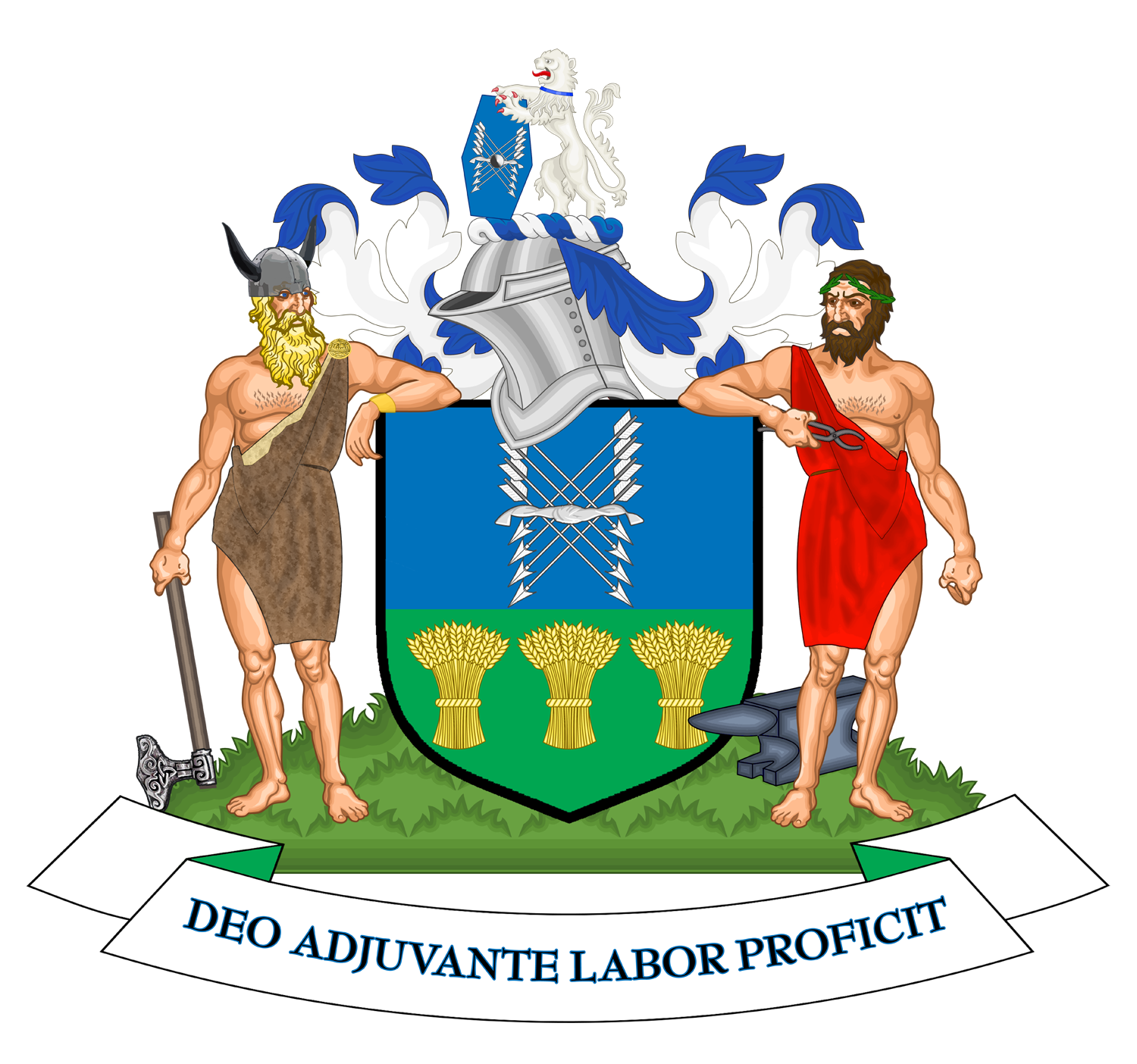
← 2018	2 May 2019	2021 →

One third of seats (28 of 84) to Sheffield City Council 43 seats needed for a majority
	First party	Second party
Leader	Julie Dore	Shaffaq Mohammed
Party	Labour	Liberal Democrats
Seats won	13	11
Seat change	▼3	▲4
Popular vote	39,361	30,526
Percentage	31.6%	24.5%
Swing	▼8.7%	Steady
	Third party	Fourth party
Leader	Rob Murphy	Jack Clarkson
Party	Green	UKIP
Seats won	4	0
Seat change	▲2	▼2
Popular vote	27,997	14,067
Percentage	22.5%	11.3%
Swing	▲4.9%	▲9.2%
- Map showing the results of the election in each ward. Colours denote the winning party as shown in the main table of results.
Council control before election
Labour
Council control after election
Labour

Elections to Sheffield City Council were held on Thursday 2 May 2019; one of a number of local council elections taking place across England and Northern Ireland on the same day. One of each ward's three seats was up for election, having last been contested in the 2016 elections.

== Election results ==
Labour, the Conservatives, the Liberal Democrats and the Green Party fielded candidates in all 28 wards (including six candidates running under the Labour Co-operative label). UKIP fielded candidates in 22 wards. The Yorkshire Party contested six wards, Democrats and Veterans contested three and the Women's Equality Party contested two, with the National Front and the Socialist Party (under the Socialist Alternative label) each fielding one candidate. There were also two independent candidates.

Data on % turnout from.

=== Overall election result ===
2019 Sheffield City Council election
Party	This election			Full council			This election		
Party	Seats	Net	Seats %	Other	Total	Total %	Votes	Votes %	+/−
Labour	13	▼4	46.4	36	49	58.3	39,361	31.6	-8.7
Liberal Democrats	11	▲4	39.3	15	26	31.0	30,526	24.5	±0.0
Green	4	▲2	14.3	4	8	9.5	27,997	22.5	+4.9
UKIP	0	▼2	0.0	1	1	1.2	14,067	11.3	+9.2
Conservative	0	Steady	0.0	0	0	0.0	9,977	8.0	-5.4
Yorkshire	0	Steady	0.0	0	0	0.0	1,605	1.3	+0.6
Women's Equality	0	Steady	0.0	0	0	0.0	352	0.3	+0.2
Democrats and Veterans	0	Steady	0.0	0	0	0.0	246	0.2	±0.0
Independent	0	Steady	0.0	0	0	0.0	173	0.1	-0.8
Socialist Alternative	0	Steady	0.0	0	0	0.0	82	0.1	-0.2
National Front	0	Steady	0.0	0	0	0.0	36	<0.1	New

Turnout 31.2%.

=== Changes in council composition ===
Party	Previous council	New council	+/-
Labour	52	49	▼3
Liberal Democrats	22	26	▲4
Green	6	8	▲2
UKIP	3	1	▼2
Independent	1	0	▼1
Total	84	84	
Working majority	20	14	

== Ward results ==
=== Beauchief & Greenhill ===
Incumbent Liberal Democrat councillor Richard Shaw was up for re-election.

Beauchief & Greenhill
Party	Candidate	Votes	%	±%
Liberal Democrats	Richard Shaw*	1,882	41.9	−2.3
Labour	Julie Gledhill	1,271	28.3	−4.4
Green	Graham Marsden	765	17.0	+7.4
Conservative	Claire Lord	576	12.8	−0.8
Majority		611	13.6	+2.1
Turnout		4,593	32.35	−2.43
Liberal Democrats hold		Swing		

=== Beighton ===
Incumbent Labour councillor Ian Saunders was up for re-election.

Beighton
Party	Candidate	Votes	%	±%
Liberal Democrats	Bob McCann	1,433	36.9	+14.8
Labour	Ian Saunders*	1,186	30.5	−13.7
UKIP	Brian Grundhill	631	16.2	+10.1
Conservative	Steven Winstone	390	10.0	−11.8
Green	Anthony Naylor	245	6.3	+0.5
Majority		247	6.4	N/A
Turnout		3,900	28.85	+3.29
Liberal Democrats gain from Labour		Swing		

=== Birley ===
Incumbent Labour councillor Denise Fox was up for re-election.

Birley
Party	Candidate	Votes	%	±%
Labour	Denise Fox*	1,363	41.3	−13.9
UKIP	Dennis Booker	796	24.1	N/A
Green	Alan Yearsley	499	15.1	+3.3
Conservative	Thomas Oulton	407	12.3	−6.9
Liberal Democrats	James Ellwood	234	7.1	+0.3
Majority		567	17.2	−18.8
Turnout		3,314	25.74	+0.01
Labour hold		Swing		

=== Broomhill & Sharrow Vale ===
The incumbent Green Party councillor and Lord Mayor of Sheffield, Magid Magid, did not defend his seat.

Broomhill & Sharrow Vale
Party	Candidate	Votes	%	±%
Green	Angela Argenzio	3,053	58.5	+9.2
Labour	Chris Ware	1,405	26.9	−8.2
Liberal Democrats	Will Sapwell	367	7.0	−1.8
Conservative	Charles Blatt	199	3.8	−2.9
UKIP	Jeffrey Shaw	126	2.4	N/A
Independent	Michael Warner	71	1.4	N/A
Majority		1,648	31.6	+17.4
Turnout		5,246	28.67	+1.29
Green hold		Swing		

=== Burngreave ===
Incumbent Labour councillor Talib Hussain was up for re-election.

Burngreave
Party	Candidate	Votes	%	±%
Labour	Talib Hussain*	2,695	68.4	−9.6
Green	Nico Hall	468	11.9	+2.9
UKIP	Debra Roberts	411	10.4	N/A
Liberal Democrats	Mary Aston	207	5.3	+0.9
Conservative	Hatau Mozayen	158	4.0	−4.5
Majority		2,227	56.5	−12.5
Turnout		3,960	27.79	−2.88
Labour hold		Swing		

=== City ===
Incumbent Green Party councillor Robert Murphy did not defend his seat.

City
Party	Candidate	Votes	%	±%
Green	Ruth Mersereau	1,186	62.5	+17.6
Labour	Janet Ridler	529	27.9	−16.1
Conservative	Janet Anber	101	5.3	+0.6
Liberal Democrats	Hashim Mahroof	82	4.3	−2.1
Majority		657	34.6	+33.7
Turnout		1,914	14.36	+1.44
Green hold		Swing		

=== Crookes & Crosspool ===
Incumbent Liberal Democrat councillor Adam Hanrahan did not defend his seat.

Crookes & Crosspool
Party	Candidate	Votes	%	±%
Liberal Democrats	Tim Huggan	2,264	38.6	−4.0
Labour Co-op	Cheryl Barrott	1,492	25.5	−7.2
Green	Emily Brooke-Davies	1,474	25.1	+10.6
Conservative	Thomas Ridgway	328	5.6	−4.6
UKIP	Karen Adams	303	5.2	N/A
Majority		772	13.1	+3.2
Turnout		5,878	40.70	−2.51
Liberal Democrats hold		Swing		

=== Darnall ===
Incumbent Labour councillor Mary Lea was up for re-election.

Darnall
Party	Candidate	Votes	%	±%
Labour	Mary Lea*	2,432	68.0	−6.4
UKIP	Karen Waddicar	457	12.8	N/A
Conservative	Dean O'Brien	292	8.2	−4.8
Liberal Democrats	Sohail Shaffaq Mohammed	217	6.1	−0.9
Green	Eamonn Ward	181	5.1	−0.4
Majority		1,975	55.2	−6.2
Turnout		3,594	26.55	−3.93
Labour hold		Swing		

=== Dore & Totley ===
Incumbent Liberal Democrat councillor Joe Otten was up for re-election.

Dore & Totley
Party	Candidate	Votes	%	±%
Liberal Democrats	Joe Otten*	3,795	57.3	+1.9
Green	David Applebaum	1,060	16.0	+7.0
Conservative	Lesley Blyth	1,006	15.2	−6.5
Labour	David Sedgley	767	11.6	−2.4
Majority		2,735	41.3	+7.6
Turnout		6,695	45.46	−1.59
Liberal Democrats hold		Swing		

=== East Ecclesfield ===
Incumbent councillor Steve Wilson was up for re-election, having won the seat for Labour in 2016. However, in February 2019 he resigned from the party and continued to sit as an independent. He contested this election as an independent candidate.

East Ecclesfield
Party	Candidate	Votes	%	±%
Liberal Democrats	Victoria Bowden	1,345	31.1	+8.8
Labour Co-op	Craig Gamble Pugh	1,129	26.1	−11.3
UKIP	David Booker	856	19.8	+11.4
Conservative	Kevin Mahoney	333	7.7	−14.8
Green	Brian Webster	268	6.2	−3.2
Yorkshire	Alex Robertson	256	5.9	N/A
Independent	Steve Wilson*	102	2.4	N/A
National Front	Jordan Pont	36	0.8	N/A
Majority		216	5.0	N/A
Turnout		4,359	31.00	+1.95
Liberal Democrats gain from Labour		Swing		

=== Ecclesall ===
Incumbent Liberal Democrat councillor Paul Scriven did not defend his seat.

Ecclesall
Party	Candidate	Votes	%	±%
Liberal Democrats	Barbara Masters	3,355	43.7	−2.5
Green	Jason Leman	1,935	25.2	+7.6
Labour	Ruth Milsom	1,443	18.8	−5.2
Conservative	Georgia Mort	545	7.1	−4.0
Women's Equality	Megan Senior	276	3.6	N/A
Democrats and Veterans	John Lowcock	119	1.6	+0.5
Majority		1,420	18.5	−3.8
Turnout		7,716	49.32	−0.33
Liberal Democrats hold		Swing		

=== Firth Park ===
Incumbent Labour councillor Abdul Khayum was up for re-election.

Firth Park
Party	Candidate	Votes	%	±%
Labour	Abdul Khayum*	1,573	51.2	−7.8
Green	Amy Mack	779	25.3	+10.7
Conservative	Samuel Bray	453	14.7	−2.9
Liberal Democrats	Ann Kingdom	270	8.8	±0.0
Majority		794	25.8	−15.6
Turnout		3,151	22.14	−0.64
Labour hold		Swing		

=== Fulwood ===
Incumbent Liberal Democrat councillor Andrew Sangar was up for re-election.

Fulwood
Party	Candidate	Votes	%	±%
Liberal Democrats	Andrew Sangar*	3,454	54.4	+2.8
Green	Judith Rutnam	1,321	20.8	+8.4
Labour	Fouad Al Mohamadi	827	13.0	−9.7
Conservative	Michael Barge	520	8.2	−5.1
UKIP	Hannah Booker	232	3.7	N/A
Majority		2,133	33.6	+4.8
Turnout		6,378	45.25	−0.39
Liberal Democrats hold		Swing		

=== Gleadless Valley ===
Incumbent Labour councillor Chris Peace did not defend her seat.

Gleadless Valley
Party	Candidate	Votes	%	±%
Green	Paul Turpin	2,514	49.8	+14.9
Labour	Nadia Jama	1,595	31.6	−11.7
UKIP	Marv Hollingworth	481	9.5	+4.1
Liberal Democrats	John Dryden	257	5.1	−3.0
Conservative	Lewis Elliott	201	4.0	−2.8
Majority		919	18.2	N/A
Turnout		5,062	37.36	+1.82
Green gain from Labour		Swing		

=== Graves Park ===
Incumbent Liberal Democrat councillor Sue Auckland was up for re-election.

Graves Park
Party	Candidate	Votes	%	±%
Liberal Democrats	Sue Auckland*	2,432	45.8	+4.5
Labour	Gareth Slater	1,092	20.6	−11.5
Green	Angela Clemson	1,040	19.6	+5.3
UKIP	Stephen Robertson	388	7.3	N/A
Conservative	Mark Finney	303	5.7	−4.6
Democrats and Veterans	John Thurley	51	1.0	−1.0
Majority		1,340	25.3	+16.1
Turnout		5,322	40.30	−0.47
Liberal Democrats hold		Swing		

=== Hillsborough ===
Incumbent Labour councillor George Lindars-Hammond was up for re-election.

Hillsborough
Party	Candidate	Votes	%	±%
Labour	George Lindars-Hammond*	1,659	37.3	−9.5
Green	Christine Gilligan Kubo	1,127	25.3	+4.6
UKIP	David Hollingworth	715	16.1	+10.2
Liberal Democrats	Stephen Porter	596	13.4	+0.4
Conservative	Theodore Wrigley	350	7.9	−4.6
Majority		532	11.0	−15.2
Turnout		4,467	30.67	−0.91
Labour hold		Swing		

=== Manor Castle ===
Incumbent Labour councillor Lisa Banes did not defend her seat; she contested the West Ecclesfield seat instead.

Manor Castle
Party	Candidate	Votes	%	±%
Labour	Sioned Richards	1,288	42.4	−12.7
Green	Ruth Flagg-Abbey	551	18.1	+0.9
UKIP	Yvonne Sykes	504	16.6	+16.6
Yorkshire	Jack Carrington	402	13.2	+4.1
Conservative	Ray Lawrence	164	5.4	−5.9
Liberal Democrats	Thomas Hague	129	4.2	−1.0
Majority		737	24.3	−13.6
Turnout		3,051	21.51	+0.75
Labour hold		Swing		

=== Mosborough ===
Incumbent Labour councillor David Barker was up for re-election.

Mosborough
Party	Candidate	Votes	%	±%
Liberal Democrats	Kevin Oxley	1,536	37.7	−4.1
Labour	David Barker*	1,199	29.4	−8.3
UKIP	Adam Wood	498	12.2	+6.9
Yorkshire	Ben Bancroft	330	8.1	N/A
Conservative	Philip Kirby	288	7.1	−4.6
Green	Julie White	225	5.5	+1.9
Majority		337	8.3	+4.3
Turnout		4,087	30.25	−0.45
Liberal Democrats gain from Labour		Swing		

=== Nether Edge & Sharrow ===
Incumbent Labour councillor Mohammad Maroof was up for re-election

Nether Edge & Sharrow
Party	Candidate	Votes	%	±%
Green	Peter Garbutt	3,735	56.2	+0.1
Labour	Mohammad Maroof*	2,302	34.6	−1.4
Liberal Democrats	Pat White	336	5.1	+1.0
Conservative	Joe Busby	198	3.0	−0.1
Democrats and Veterans	David Gate	76	1.1	N/A
Majority		1,433	21.6	+1.6
Turnout		6,682	44.05	+0.56
Green gain from Labour		Swing		

=== Park & Arbourthorne ===
Incumbent Labour Co-op councillor Ben Miskell was up for re-election.

Park & Arbourthorne
Party	Candidate	Votes	%	±%
Labour Co-op	Ben Miskell*	1,203	38.2	−13.8
UKIP	Dennise Dawson	673	21.4	N/A
Green	Jen Barnard	445	14.1	−1.3
Conservative	Hilary Gay	319	10.1	−8.0
Liberal Democrats	Susan Ross	259	8.2	−2.1
Yorkshire	Alex Martin	171	5.4	N/A
Socialist Alternative	Alistair Tice	82	2.6	N/A
Majority		530	16.8	−17.1
Turnout		3,166	24.10	−0.73
Labour Co-op hold		Swing		

=== Richmond ===
Incumbent Labour councillor Dianne Hurst was up for re-election.

Richmond
Party	Candidate	Votes	%	±%
Labour	Dianne Hurst*	1,478	44.3	−8.8
UKIP	Brian Kus	815	24.4	N/A
Conservative	Richard Blyth	431	12.9	−10.6
Green	Catherine Hartley	419	12.6	+1.7
Liberal Democrats	Diane Leek	194	5.8	−2.7
Majority		663	19.9	−9.7
Turnout		3,358	23.45	−0.37
Labour hold		Swing		

=== Shiregreen & Brightside ===
Incumbent Labour Co-op councillor Dawn Dale was up for re-election.

Shiregreen & Brightside
Party	Candidate	Votes	%	±%
Labour Co-op	Dawn Dale*	1,355	44.6	−16.9
UKIP	Tracy Booker	976	32.1	+18.8
Green	Milton Pennefather	283	9.3	+2.9
Conservative	Edward Higgins	261	8.6	−4.5
Liberal Democrats	Allan Wisbey	163	5.4	−0.4
Majority		379	12.5	−35.7
Turnout		3,050	22.08	+0.25
Labour Co-op hold		Swing		

=== Southey ===
Incumbent Labour councillor Mike Chaplin was up for re-election, having won a by-election in 2017 to hold the seat for Labour.

Southey
Party	Candidate	Votes	%	±%
Labour	Mike Chaplin*	1,341	45.8	−10.5
UKIP	Shane Harper	840	28.7	+17.4
Green	Andrew Hards	367	12.5	+2.7
Conservative	Alex Noonan	196	6.7	−6.6
Liberal Democrats	Chris Tosseano	183	6.3	−1.3
Majority		501	17.1	−26.0
Turnout		2,941	20.98	+0.50
Labour hold		Swing		

=== Stannington ===
Incumbent Liberal Democrat councillor Penny Baker was up for re-election.

Stannington
Party	Candidate	Votes	%	±%
Liberal Democrats	Penny Baker*	2,367	46.2	−2.2
Labour	Zoe Sykes	904	17.7	−5.7
Green	Stewart Kemp	740	14.5	+3.5
UKIP	Anthony Sykes	675	13.2	N/A
Conservative	Adam Allcroft	435	8.5	−8.7
Majority		1,463	28.5	+3.5
Turnout		5,152	35.75	−0.42
Liberal Democrats hold		Swing		

=== Stocksbridge & Upper Don ===
Incumbent UKIP councillor Keith Davis did not defend his seat.

Stocksbridge & Upper Don
Party	Candidate	Votes	%	±%
Labour	Julie Grocutt	1,727	34.9	−2.4
UKIP	Graeme Waddicar	1,077	21.8	+10.6
Conservative	Chris Pepple	662	13.4	−9.3
Green	David Willington	596	12.0	+3.6
Liberal Democrats	Kurtis Crossland	557	11.3	−0.8
Yorkshire	William Pitt	330	6.7	−1.6
Majority		650	13.1	−1.5
Turnout		4,978	34.33	+0.79
Labour gain from UKIP		Swing		

=== Walkley ===
Incumbent Labour Co-op councillor Ben Curran was up for re-election.

Walkley
Party	Candidate	Votes	%	±%
Labour Co-op	Ben Curran*	1,852	35.7	−7.8
Green	Bernard Little	1,811	34.9	+5.0
Liberal Democrats	Rebecca Atkinson	736	14.2	+3.0
UKIP	Ian Howarth	389	7.5	N/A
Conservative	Matthew Fender	210	4.0	−3.9
Yorkshire	Jack Bannan	116	2.2	−1.2
Women's Equality	Amy Gooding	76	1.5	−1.5
Majority		41	0.8	−12.8
Turnout		5,214	28.50	−4.49
Labour hold		Swing		

=== West Ecclesfield ===
Incumbent UKIP councillor John Booker was up for re-election. Labour’s candidate, Lisa Banes, was a sitting councillor for Manor Castle ward.

West Ecclesfield
Party	Candidate	Votes	%	±%
Liberal Democrats	Alan Hooper	1,685	37.3	−2.4
UKIP	John Booker*	1,291	28.6	N/A
Labour	Lisa Banes**	895	19.8	−7.9
Green	Kathy Aston	384	8.5	+4.8
Conservative	Alastair Geddes	258	5.7	−5.0
Majority		394	8.7	−3.3
Turnout		4,568	33.05	−0.86
Liberal Democrats gain from UKIP		Swing		

=== Woodhouse ===
Incumbent Labour councillor Jackie Satur was up for re-election.

Woodhouse
Party	Candidate	Votes	%	±%
Labour	Jackie Satur*	1,359	39.9	−19.0
UKIP	Rachael Barstow	933	27.4	N/A
Green	John Grant	526	15.5	+1.4
Conservative	William Blyth	393	11.6	−9.5
Liberal Democrats	Christopher Brown	191	5.6	−0.4
Majority		426	12.5	−25.3
Turnout		3,414	25.78	+0.11
Labour hold		Swing		
