= Magid Magid =

Somali-British politician and activist (born 1989)

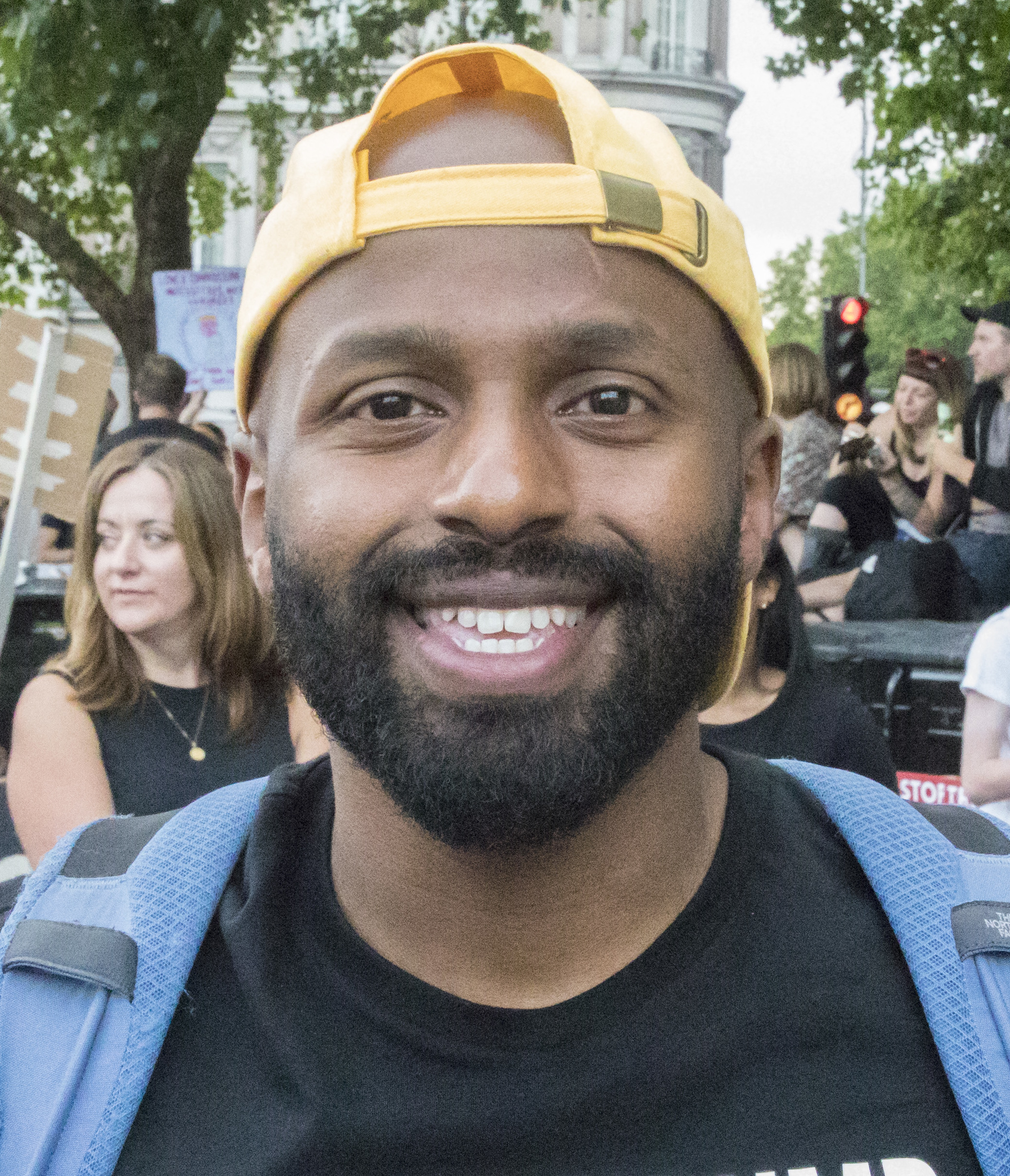

Member of the European Parliament for Yorkshire and the Humber
- In office 2 July 2019 – 31 January 2020
- Preceded by: Amjad Bashir
- Succeeded by: Constituency abolished

122nd Lord Mayor of Sheffield
- In office 16 May 2018 – 16 May 2019
- Deputy: Tony Downing
- Preceded by: Anne Murphy
- Succeeded by: Tony Downing

Sheffield City Councillor for Broomhill and Sharrow Vale
- In office 5 May 2016 – 2 May 2019
- Preceded by: Ward created
- Succeeded by: Angela Argenzio

Personal details
- Born: 26 June 1989 (age 37) Burao, Somali Democratic Republic
- Citizenship: British citizenship
- Party: Green Party of England and Wales
- Education: University of Hull
- Website: www.magicmagid.com

Magid Magid (/ˈmædʒɪd ˈmædʒɪd/, born 26 June 1989), also known as Magid Mah and Magic Magid, is a Somali-British activist and politician who served as the Lord Mayor of Sheffield from May 2018 to May 2019. His appointment attracted significant media attention, as he is the first ethnic-Somali, the youngest-ever, and the first Green Party councillor to hold the role. In May 2019, he was elected to the European Parliament as Green Party MEP for Yorkshire and the Humber.

Born in Burao, Somaliland, Magid came as a child refugee to Britain in 1994. He grew up in Burngreave, Sheffield, and studied aquatic zoology at the University of Hull where he was elected president of Hull University Union. He has worked in digital marketing and was elected as a Green Party councillor on Sheffield City Council in 2016. From 2017 to 2018, he served as Deputy Lord Mayor, and during this period he participated in the third series of the reality show Hunted.

== Early life and education ==
Magid was born in Burao, the capital city of the Togdheer region in Somaliland. Around the time of his birth, the Somali Civil War broke out. His mother, and five siblings, left Somalia in 1994 "to find a better life," and they spent six months in a refugee camp in Ethiopia before being admitted to Britain. The family moved to the Burngreave area of Sheffield. Growing up, Magid has said that he remembers "just being happy" but notes difficulties in his childhood. He has said that life was difficult for his family as he moved to Britain without being able to speak English, and they had to learn this new language as well as adapt to a new way of life. His mother worked as a cleaner to support her children through school. Burngreave was one of Sheffield's most economically-deprived areas during the early 2000s. Magid has said that he didn't "have much in the way of a male role model," continuing that "it is easy to become a product of your own environment, and a lot of my environment was negative. So I was a bit of a pain in the arse for a while."

Magid attended Fir Vale School in Sheffield, and studied A Levels in Psychology, Law, and philosophy, at Longley Park Sixth Form College. He cites an important part of his development being his interest in music, and at school he used to create and sell his own mixtapes on CDs. He finished sixth form in 2008 and went on to raise his own funds, working 12-hour shifts for 9 weeks, to go on a gap year that he spent travelling. He visited the Swiss Alps, where he went on a mountaineering course, as well as Egypt, Kenya, Tanzania, Zanzibar, and Germany, where he ran the Berlin Marathon. By 17, Magid had developed an interest in mountaineering as a hobby, and in September 2009 went on a trip to Kilimanjaro, enlisted the help of a local guide, and climbed the mountain.

Magid decided that he wanted to go to university, and began a degree in aquatic zoology at the University of Hull after his gap year. He founded the university's Mixed Martial Arts club, where he gained the nickname 'Magic Magid the Submission Magician'. He was elected as president of the students' union, the Hull University Union, where he notes that he was not "politically savvy" but knew that he "cared about certain issues." In 2013, as students' union president, Magid faced a letter of complaint from several union councillors, but due to administrative error in the way in which it was brought, it did not lead to a motion of censure. Following university, Magid has worked in digital marketing. He has also worked for the charity Shelter, and been self-employed.

In July 2023, Magid also took an honorary doctorate from the University of York.

== Political career ==
=== Sheffield councillor ===
Magid joined the Green Party of England and Wales in 2014, despite many of his family and friends being Labour Party supporters. He decided to join the party having been affected by the rise of UKIP as a political force in England. On UKIP, he has said that they were "competent at being evil" and "exploited people's disengagement with politics and their frustration." He worked with the existing Green Party councillors in Broomhill and Sharrow Vale, and was elected as Fundraising Officer of the Sheffield Green Party. He was elected as a Green councillor representing the ward in the 2016 election. He has said that, regarding his political rise, "There's a lot of luck involved."

As a councillor, Magid has sat on the Safer and Stronger Communities Scrutiny and Policy Committee and on the Senior Officer Employment Committee. Between his election and 1 June 2018, he had attended 90% of all meetings, and given apologies for all of his absences. He has said that his main priorities as a councillor are to establish strong partnerships between the students and residents living in his ward as well as protecting conservation areas in the ward. Politically, Magid is a republican, stating that while he believes hereditary heads of state to be an outdated concept, he does not find the members of the royal family objectionable. He has also stated support for greater devolution, free university education, and an end to private finance initiatives.

Magid ran the Sheffield Half Marathon in April 2017 dressed as a tree to object to the council's felling policies. He ran the London Marathon in 2017 to raise money for St John Ambulance. He was chosen by Sheffield City Council to serve as Deputy Lord Mayor from May 2017 to May 2018. He was not present for his inauguration ceremony as he was filming the show Hunted. In October 2017, Magid was shortlisted for the Young Councillor of the Year award as part of the LGiU and CCLA's Councillor Achievement Awards. In May 2018, Magid raised money for Sheffield war memorial by leading a static cycling challenge.

In February 2019, Magid announced that he would not be contesting the 2019 Sheffield City Council election and would therefore be standing down as a councillor. He was succeeded by the successful Green candidate Angela Argenzio.

=== Lord Mayorship ===
Magid was nominated for the role of Lord Mayor of Sheffield by his three fellow Green Party councillors. The post, which is a ceremonial one, means the officeholder must represent the council and the city, speak at a variety of official functions, and undertake a range of ceremonial duties. He was chosen by majority vote by the whole council, and sworn in on 16 May 2018. His aim has been to end the "archaic" nature of the role, and reflected this in his inauguration ceremony, where the Imperial March from Star Wars, and the Superman theme, were both played. During his speech at the ceremony, he condemned racism and "post-Brexit xenophobia". In his inaugural portrait, Magid squatted on a balustrade wearing green Dr. Martens boots; the image then went viral on Twitter.

Following his appointment, Magid noted the "backlash from right wing media," and some "racist comments," but said the vast majority of feedback to his appointment had been positive. In October 2018, he appointed Sheffield's first poet laureate in the form of rapper Otis Mensah. The three charities he was to support as Lord Mayor were Flourish, a mental health organisation, Sheffield Women's Counselling and Therapy Services, and the Unity Gym Project. His fundraising aim as Lord Mayor was £100,000, a record aim for a Lord Mayor of Sheffield. He encouraged people to apply to be his 'consort' and accompany him on official duties, as a way to improve engagement. Within a week of his appointment, he appeared on Daily Politics, where he confronted Jacob Rees-Mogg for calling Magid's story "brilliant and refreshing." In a July tweet, Magid described US President Donald Trump as a "wasteman" and stated that he was banning him from the city of Sheffield, though Sheffield City Council stated that he does not have the power to do so.

=== Member of the European Parliament ===
Magid Magid presenting himself in a video produced by Heinrich Böll Foundation/Green European Foundation.

In April 2019, Magid announced that he would be seeking nomination as a Green Party candidate for the 2019 European Parliament elections, and was subsequently selected as the party's lead candidate for Yorkshire and the Humber, of which he was elected with 13% of the vote.

Magid's election made him the first MEP for the Green Party in the Yorkshire & Humber region. After the vote, Magid said in a piece for The Guardian that he was "honoured to have been elected" and "determined to offer an alternative to the politics of fear". He also criticised populist politicians such as Matteo Salvini and Nigel Farage, saying that their rhetoric is "a daily declaration of war on the ... peace of Europe". Magid ceased to be an MEP when the United Kingdom left the European Union on 31 January 2020.

From July 2019 until January 2020, he was a member of the European Parliament Committee on Civil Liberties, Justice and Home Affairs.

== Hunted appearance ==
Magid was a contestant on the third series of the reality show Hunted in 2018. He became a fan favourite for taunting the hunters, at one point sending them a letter calling them "mugs" in Somali, which was mistranslated to "cups of tea." After 19 days on the run, he was caught in the Peak District. Following his capture, Magid announced his frustrations on Twitter over the manipulative nature of the show, saying the producers wanted to create "good TV" rather than a real challenge.

== Union of Justice ==
After leaving his role as an MEP Magid went on to set up the initiative Union of Justice, an organisation dedicated to racial justice and climate justice. The initiative received initial funding from the European Cultural Foundation. The activities of Union of Justice in the form of online events began in April 2021.

In May 2022, Magid chaired a discussion with former Labour leader Jeremy Corbyn at Sheffield's Festival of Debate.

== Works ==
- Magid Magid, The Art of Disruption: A Manifesto For Real Change (London: Blink, 2020), ISBN 9781788702904
