= 2018 Sheffield City Council election =

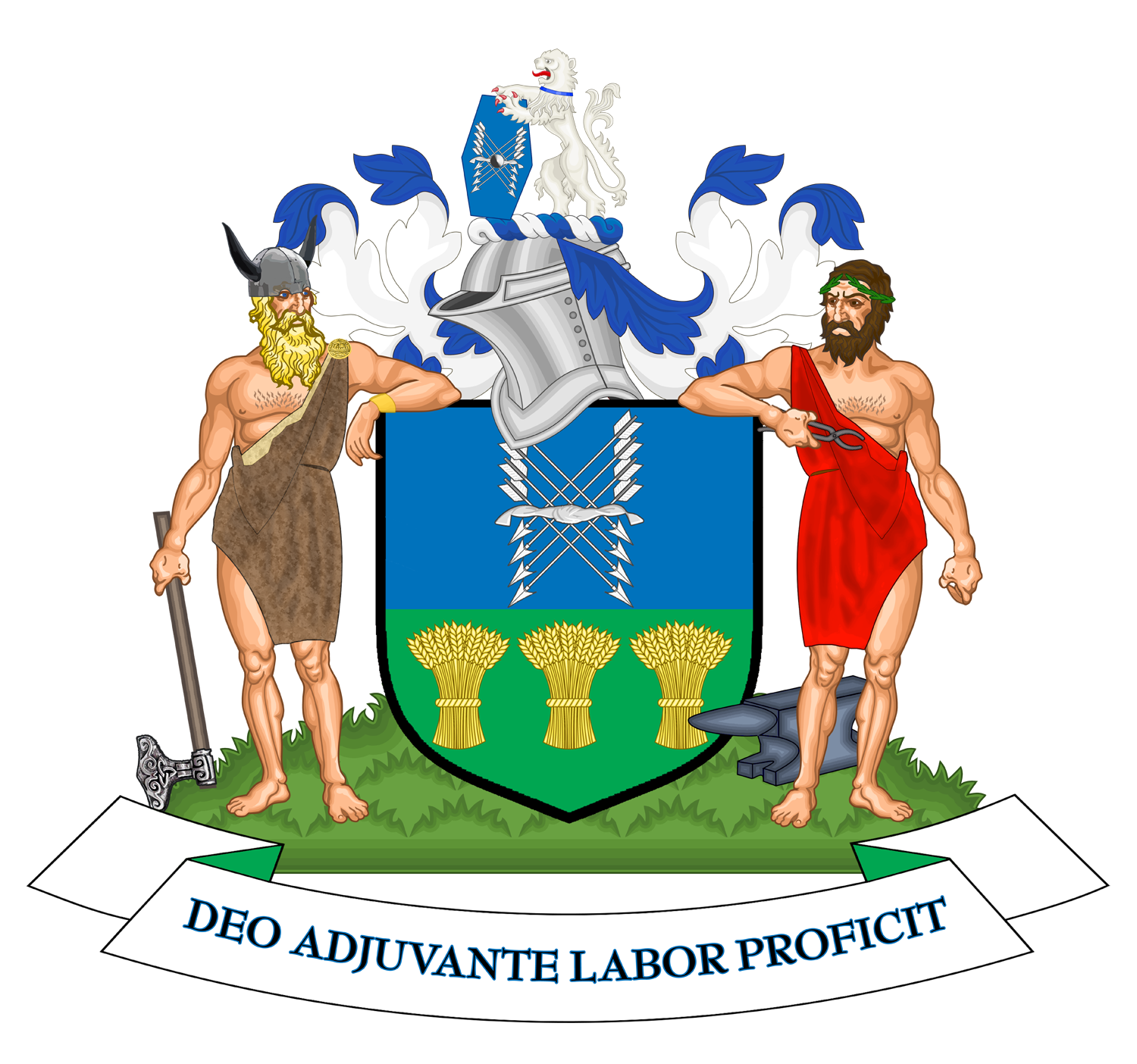
← 2016	3 May 2018	2019 →

One third of seats (28 of 84) to Sheffield City Council 43 seats needed for a majority
	First party	Second party
Party	Labour	Liberal Democrats
Seats won	16	9
Seat change	▼4	▲3
Popular vote	51,583	31,359
Percentage	40.3%	24.5%
Swing	▲1.2%	▲3.4%
	Third party	Fourth party
Party	Green	UKIP
Seats won	3	0
Seat change	▲2	▼1
Popular vote	22,552	3,194
Percentage	17.6%	2.1%
Swing	▲4.2%	▼13.2%
- Map showing the results of the election in each ward. Colours denote the winning party as shown in the main table of results.
Council control before election
Labour
Council control after election
Labour

Elections to Sheffield City Council took place on Thursday 3 May; one of a number of local council elections taking place across England on the same day. These were the first elections since 2016; the normal practice of electing one-third of councillors every year resumed this year, after the previous staging had seen all seats up for election as a result of boundary changes. A number of by-elections had also occurred between the 2016 and 2018 elections.

== Election results ==
=== Overall election result ===
Sheffield City Council Election Result 2018
Party	Seats	Gains	Losses	Net gain/loss	Seats %	Votes %	Votes	+/−
Labour	16	1	5	-4	57.1	40.3	51,583	+1.2
Liberal Democrats	9	3	0	+3	32.1	24.5	31,359	+3.4
Green	3	2	0	+2	10.7	17.6	22,552	+4.2
Conservative	0	0	0	0	0.0	13.4	17,181	+5.0
UKIP	0	0	1	-1	0.0	2.1	2,647	-13.2
Independent	0	0	0	0	0.0	0.9	1,095	+0.7
Yorkshire	0	0	0	0	0.0	0.7	856	+0.4
TUSC	0	0	0	0	0.0	0.3	435	-1.8
Democrats and Veterans	0	0	0	0	0.0	0.2	195	New
Women's Equality	0	0	0	0	0.0	0.1	162	New

=== Changes in council composition ===
Party	Previous council	New council	+/-
Labour	56	53	▼3
Liberal Democrats	20	22	▲2
Green	4	6	▲2
UKIP	4	3	▼1
Total	84	84	
Working majority	28	22	

== Ward results ==
=== Beauchief & Greenhill ===
Beauchief & Greenhill
Party	Candidate	Votes	%	±%
Liberal Democrats	Simon Clement-Jones	2,193	44.2	+3.1
Labour	Julie Gledhill	1,622	32.7	+0.2
Conservative	Claire Lord	674	13.6	+7.5
Green	Graham Marsden	476	9.6	+2.6
Majority		571	11.5	+2.9
Turnout		4,988	34.78	−4
Liberal Democrats hold		Swing		

=== Beighton ===
Beighton
Party	Candidate	Votes	%	±%
Labour	Chris Rosling-Josephs*	1,544	44.2	+0.2
Liberal Democrats	Bob McCann	773	22.1	+15.6
Conservative	Shirley Clayton	763	21.8	+1.7
UKIP	Brian Grundhill	213	6.1	−23.7
Green	Anthony Naylor	202	5.8	−0.4
Majority		771	22.1	+7.9
Turnout		3,505	25.56	−2
Labour hold		Swing		

=== Birley ===
Birley
Party	Candidate	Votes	%	±%
Labour	Karen McGowan*	1,835	55.2	+9.3
Conservative	Michael Barge	638	19.2	+8.9
Green	Ruth Mersereau	393	11.8	+3.5
Independent	Anthony Cronshaw	233	7.0	N/A
Liberal Democrats	Kevin Oxley	225	6.8	−1.9
Majority		1,197	36.0	+15.7
Turnout		3,341	25.73	−3
Labour hold		Swing		

=== Broomhill & Sharrow Vale ===
Broomhill & Sharrow Vale
Party	Candidate	Votes	%	±%
Green	Kaltum Rivers	2,703	49.3	+13.1
Labour	Janet Ridler	1,926	35.1	−3.8
Liberal Democrats	Barbara Masters	483	8.8	−3.5
Conservative	Laurence Smith	369	6.7	−0.7
Majority		777	14.2	N/A
Turnout		5,511	27.38	−5
Green gain from Labour		Swing		

=== Burngreave ===
Burngreave
Party	Candidate	Votes	%	±%
Labour	Mark Jones*	3,434	78.0	+24.3
Green	Chris Sissons	398	9.0	+1.3
Conservative	Stephen Toone	375	8.5	+3.0
Liberal Democrats	Shelley Cockayne	194	4.4	−1.8
Majority		3,036	69.0	+25.7
Turnout		4,445	30.67	−6
Labour hold		Swing		

=== City ===
City
Party	Candidate	Votes	%	±%
Green	Martin Phipps	826	44.9	+4.1
Labour	Beverley Thomas	810	44.0	+1.4
Liberal Democrats	Julia Wright	118	6.4	−3.7
Conservative	Hatau Mozayen	86	4.7	−2.7
Majority		16	0.9	N/A
Turnout		1,854	12.92	−7
Green gain from Labour		Swing		

=== Crookes & Crosspool ===
Crookes & Crosspool
Party	Candidate	Votes	%	±%
Liberal Democrats	Mohammed Mahroof	2,752	42.6	+12.3
Labour Co-op	Craig Gamble Pugh*	2,109	32.7	−0.5
Green	Theo Routh	936	14.5	−6.5
Conservative	Alexandra Boman-Flavell	661	10.2	+2.9
Majority		643	9.9	N/A
Turnout		6,480	43.21	−4
Liberal Democrats gain from Labour Co-op		Swing		

=== Darnall ===
Darnall
Party	Candidate	Votes	%	±%
Labour	Zahira Naz*	3,057	74.4	+18.2
Conservative	Dean O'Brien	534	13.0	+8.6
Liberal Democrats	Kurtis Crossland	289	7.0	+0.4
Green	Joydu Al-Mahfuz	227	5.5	−0.2
Majority		2,523	61.4	+21.2
Turnout		4,146	30.48	−3
Labour hold		Swing		

=== Dore & Totley ===
Dore & Totley
Party	Candidate	Votes	%	±%
Liberal Democrats	Martin Smith*	3,861	55.4	+6.3
Conservative	Lesley Blyth	1,512	21.7	+2.6
Labour	Lee Rock	974	14.0	−1.5
Green	David Applebaum	624	9.0	+0.6
Majority		2,349	33.7	+3.7
Turnout		6,994	47.05	±0
Liberal Democrats hold		Swing		

=== East Ecclesfield ===
East Ecclesfield
Party	Candidate	Votes	%	±%
Labour	Moya O'Rourke**	1,534	37.4	+5.7
Conservative	Adam Allcroft	922	22.5	+11.7
Liberal Democrats	Victoria Bowden	916	22.3	+5.1
Green	Kaye Horsfield	387	9.4	+3.7
UKIP	Dennise Dawson	343	8.4	−24.1
Majority		612	14.9	
Turnout		4,113	29.05	−4
Labour gain from UKIP		Swing	N/A	

O’Rourke was a sitting councillor for City ward.

=== Ecclesall ===
Ecclesall
Party	Candidate	Votes	%	±%
Liberal Democrats	Shaffaq Mohammed*	3,614	46.2	+10.1
Labour	Phil Wymer	1,874	24.0	−6.7
Green	Jason Leman	1,374	17.6	+7.0
Conservative	Pat Barnsley	871	11.1	+0.9
Democrats and Veterans	John Lowcock	87	1.1	−5.6
Majority		1,740	22.3	+16.9
Turnout		7,845	49.65	+1
Liberal Democrats hold		Swing		

=== Firth Park ===
Firth Park
Party	Candidate	Votes	%	±%
Labour	Abitsam Mohamed*	1,931	59.0	+14.0
Conservative	Samuel Bray	577	17.6	+10.2
Green	Amy Mack	478	14.6	+3.8
Liberal Democrats	Ann Kingdom	287	8.8	+2.2
Majority		1,354	41.4	+14.7
Turnout		3,293	22.78	−6
Labour hold		Swing		

=== Fulwood ===
Fulwood
Party	Candidate	Votes	%	±%
Liberal Democrats	Cliff Woodcraft*	3,365	51.6	+0.8
Labour	Dominic Ridler	1,478	22.7	−0.3
Conservative	Judy Burkinshaw	870	13.3	+2.7
Green	Judith Rutnam	805	12.4	+0.6
Majority		1,877	28.8	+1.0
Turnout		6,568	45.64	+3
Liberal Democrats hold		Swing		

=== Gleadless Valley ===
Gleadless Valley
Party	Candidate	Votes	%	±%
Labour	Cate McDonald*	2,126	43.3	−10.7
Green	Paul Turpin	1,715	34.9	+9.0
Liberal Democrats	John Dryden	396	8.1	−4.5
Conservative	Matthew Rowland	334	6.8	−1.7
UKIP	Marv Hollingworth	263	5.4	−11.4
TUSC	Keith Endean	78	1.6	−4.6
Majority		411	8.4	−19.7
Turnout		4,926	35.54	+6
Labour hold		Swing		

=== Graves Park ===
Graves Park
Party	Candidate	Votes	%	±%
Liberal Democrats	Steve Ayris*	2,246	41.3	−2.4
Labour	Mark Seddon	1,747	32.1	+0.2
Green	Angela Clemson	775	14.3	+1.7
Conservative	Mark Finney	559	10.3	+2.0
Democrats and Veterans	John Thurley	108	2.0	N/A
Majority		499	9.2	−2.6
Turnout		5,458	40.77	±0
Liberal Democrats hold		Swing		

=== Hillsborough ===
Hillsborough
Party	Candidate	Votes	%	±%
Labour	Josie Paszek*	2,191	46.8	+5.7
Green	Christine Gilligan Kubo	967	20.7	+8.1
Liberal Democrats	Jonathan Harston	610	13.0	+1.4
Conservative	Connor Innes	584	12.5	+4.6
UKIP	Karen Waddicar	277	5.9	−15.7
TUSC	Roan James	51	1.1	−2.3
Majority		1,224	26.2	+6.7
Turnout		4,698	31.58	−6
Labour hold		Swing		

=== Manor Castle ===
Manor Castle
Party	Candidate	Votes	%	±%
Labour	Terry Fox*	1,626	55.1	+5.4
Green	Malcolm Liles	508	17.2	+4.7
Conservative	Thomas Ridgeway	332	11.3	+3.5
Yorkshire	Jack Carrington	268	9.1	−3.9
Liberal Democrats	David Gregg	152	5.2	−4.7
TUSC	Alistair Tice	64	2.2	−5.2
Majority		1,118	37.9	+7.5
Turnout		2,970	20.76	−2
Labour hold		Swing		

=== Mosborough ===
Mosborough
Party	Candidate	Votes	%	±%
Liberal Democrats	Gail Smith*	1,788	41.8	+26.2
Labour	Sarah Young	1,615	37.7	−3.1
Conservative	Andrew Taylor	499	11.7	−4.2
UKIP	Adam Wood	225	5.3	−19.8
Green	Julie White	153	3.6	+0.1
Majority		173	4.0	N/A
Turnout		4,295	31.70	+2
Liberal Democrats gain from Labour		Swing		

=== Nether Edge & Sharrow ===
Nether Edge & Sharrow
Party	Candidate	Votes	%	±%
Green	Alison Teal*	3,896	56.1	+18.6
Labour	Nadia Jama	2,503	36.0	−1.4
Liberal Democrats	Kyle Crossland	285	4.1	−11.9
Conservative	Joseph Busby	213	3.1	−1.2
UKIP	Jeffrey Shaw	52	0.7	−3.3
Majority		1,393	20.0	+19.9
Turnout		6,994	43.49	−4
Green hold		Swing		

=== Park & Arbourthorne ===
Park & Arbourthorne
Party	Candidate	Votes	%	±%
Labour	Jack Scott*	1,688	52.0	+8.9
Conservative	Richard Blyth	588	18.1	+7.0
Green	Jen Barnard	499	15.4	+2.5
Liberal Democrats	Shelley Walsh	333	10.3	+0.1
TUSC	Liz Morton	140	4.3	−2.0
Majority		1,100	33.9	+19.4
Turnout		3,281	24.83	−2
Labour hold		Swing		

=== Richmond ===
Richmond
Party	Candidate	Votes	%	±%
Labour	Peter Rippon*	1,819	53.1	+10.0
Conservative	Benjamin Dugher	805	23.5	+12.6
Green	Catherine Hartley	511	14.9	+7.7
Liberal Democrats	David Chapman	290	8.5	+0.4
Majority		1,014	29.6	+15.1
Turnout		3,446	23.82	−2.6
Labour hold		Swing		

=== Shiregreen & Brightside ===
Shiregreen & Brightside
Party	Candidate	Votes	%	±%
Labour	Garry Weatherall*	1,879	61.5	+18.2
UKIP	Tracy Booker	405	13.3	−13.5
Conservative	Edward Davey	401	13.1	+9.1
Green	Milton Pennefather	194	6.4	+3.2
Liberal Democrats	Alex Eagle	176	5.8	+0.9
Majority		1,474	48.2	+31.7
Turnout		3,073	21.83	−7
Labour hold		Swing		

=== Southey ===
Southey
Party	Candidate	Votes	%	±%
Labour	Jayne Dunn*	1,601	56.3	+8.9
Conservative	Charles Blatt	377	13.3	+8.4
UKIP	Shane Harper	322	11.3	−19.0
Green	Andrew Hards	279	9.8	+4.8
Liberal Democrats	Philip Brown	217	7.6	+2.3
TUSC	Jeremy Short	46	1.6	±0.0
Majority		1,224	43.1	+26.0
Turnout		2,857	20.48	−8
Labour hold		Swing		

=== Stannington ===
Stannington
Party	Candidate	Votes	%	±%
Liberal Democrats	Vickie Priestley*	2,528	48.4	+7.2
Labour	Joshua Wilson	1,222	23.4	−2.2
Conservative	Miriam Cates	898	17.2	+11.0
Green	Stewart Kemp	573	11.0	+2.2
Majority		1,306	25.0	+9.4
Turnout		5,254	36.17	−3
Liberal Democrats hold		Swing		

=== Stocksbridge & Upper Don ===
Stocksbridge & Upper Don
Party	Candidate	Votes	%	±%
Labour	Francyne Johnson	1,814	37.3	+3.8
Conservative	Andrew Brooker	1,103	22.7	+8.8
Liberal Democrats	Tim Lewis	591	12.1	+0.7
UKIP	Graeme Waddicar	547	11.2	−22.3
Green	David Willington	409	8.4	−0.5
Yorkshire	William Pitt	405	8.3	N/A
Majority		711	14.6	+14.5
Turnout		4,886	33.54	−1
Labour hold		Swing		

=== Walkley ===
Walkley
Party	Candidate	Votes	%	±%
Labour Co-op	Neale Gibson*	2,316	43.5	+2.7
Green	Bernard Little	1,593	29.9	−4.7
Liberal Democrats	Rebecca Atkinson	594	11.2	−4.2
Conservative	Matthew Fender	418	7.9	+1.5
Yorkshire	Jack Bannan	183	3.4	N/A
Women's Equality	Ann Butler	162	3.0	N/A
TUSC	Victoria Wainwright	56	1.1	−2.0
Majority		723	13.6	+7.4
Turnout		5,352	32.99	−2
Labour Co-op hold		Swing		

=== West Ecclesfield ===
West Ecclesfield
Party	Candidate	Votes	%	±%
Liberal Democrats	Mike Levery	1,881	39.7	+18.4
Labour	Zoe Sykes*	1,314	27.7	−3.8
Independent	Dave Ogle	862	18.2	−13.3
Conservative	Kevin Mahoney	505	10.7	−0.3
Green	Jemima Perry	175	3.7	−1.4
Majority		567	12.0	N/A
Turnout		4,759	33.91	±0
Liberal Democrats gain from Labour		Swing		

=== Woodhouse ===
Woodhouse
Party	Candidate	Votes	%	±%
Labour	Paul Wood*	1,994	58.9	+13.9
Conservative	William Blyth	713	21.1	+10.8
Green	John Grant	476	14.1	+3.1
Liberal Democrats	Chris Tosseano	202	6.0	−2.0
Majority		1,281	37.8	+19.9
Turnout		3,415	25.67	−2
Labour hold		Swing		
