= 2015 Sheffield City Council election =

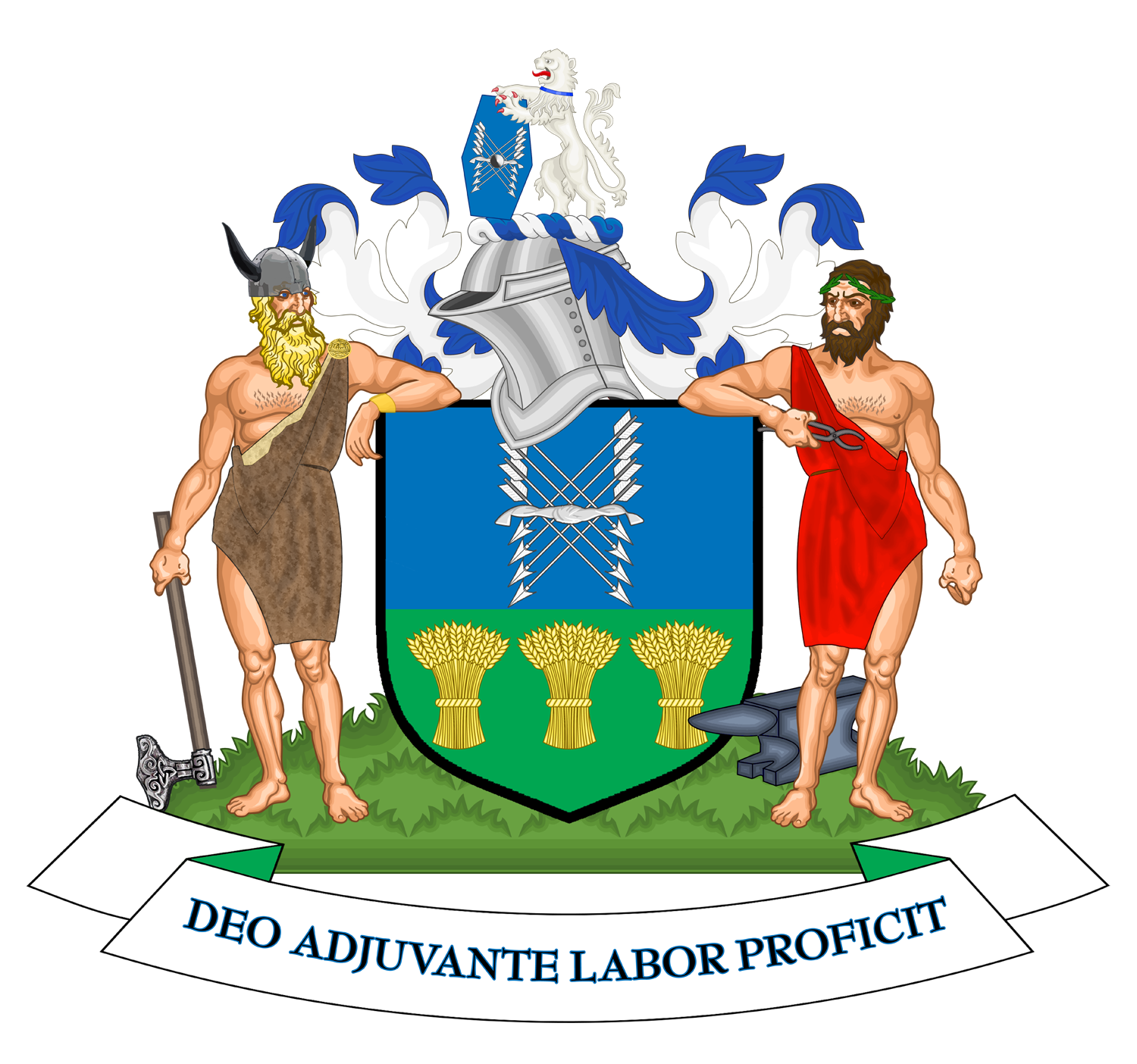
← 2014	7 May 2015	2016 →

One third of seats (28 of 84) to Sheffield City Council 43 seats needed for a majority
	First party	Second party
Party	Labour	Liberal Democrats
Seats won	21	5
Seat change	0	▼1
	Third party	Fourth party
Party	Green	UKIP
Seats won	1	1
Seat change	0	▲1
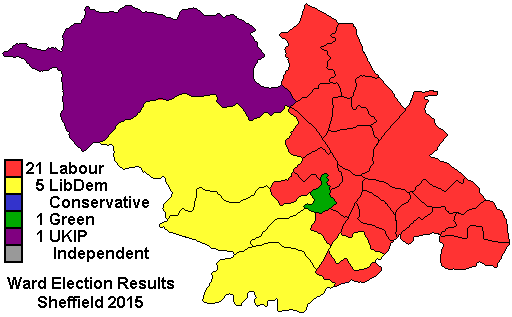
- Map showing the results of the 2015 Sheffield City Council elections.
Majority party before election
Labour
Majority party after election
Labour

Sheffield City Council elections took place on Thursday 7 May 2015, the same day as the UK general election and local Parish Council elections. There were 28 seats up for election, one of the three councillors from each ward.

== Election result ==
Source.

Sheffield City Council Election Result 2015
Party	Seats	Gains	Losses	Net gain/loss	Seats %	Votes %	Votes	+/−
Labour	21	2	2	0	75.0	41.1	103,861	+4.5
UKIP	1	1	0	+1	3.6	16.8	42,489	-6.2
Liberal Democrats	5	0	1	-1	17.9	16.5	41,664	-1.4
Conservative	0	0	0	0	0.0	12.5	31,658	+5.4
Green	1	1	1	0	3.6	12.0	30,246	-0.6
TUSC	0	0	0	0	0.0	1.2	3,053	-0.6

This result had the following consequences for the total number of seats on the Council after the elections:

Party	Previous council	New council	+/-
Labour	59	59	0
Liberal Democrats	18	17	▼1
Greens	4	4	0
UKIP	3	4	▲1
Total	84	84	
Working majority	34	34	

== Ward results ==
=== Arbourthorne ===
Arbourthorne
Party	Candidate	Votes	%	±%
Labour	Mike Drabble*	3,653	51.2	+9.5
UKIP	Bob Sheridan	1,573	22.1	−8.8
Conservative	Peter Smith	805	11.3	+2.8
Green	Jennyfer Barnard	498	7.0	−0.5
Liberal Democrats	Elizabeth Ross	467	6.6	+1.1
TUSC	Alan Munro	138	1.9	−4.0
Majority		2,080	29.2	+18.4
Turnout		7,134	53.8	+25.6
Labour hold		Swing		

=== Beauchief & Greenhill ===
Beauchief & Greenhill
Party	Candidate	Votes	%	±%
Labour	Julie Gledhill	3,209	36.1	+7.5
Liberal Democrats	Simon Clement-Jones*	2,651	29.8	−2.8
UKIP	Shane Harper	1,456	16.4	−7.3
Conservative	Michelle Grant	1,049	11.8	+4.9
Green	Paul Horada-Bradnum	456	5.1	−1.6
TUSC	Terry Murphy	74	0.8	−0.7
Majority		558	6.3	N/A
Turnout		8,895	64.6	+25.7
Labour gain from Liberal Democrats		Swing		

=== Beighton ===
Beighton
Party	Candidate	Votes	%	±%
Labour	Chris Rosling-Josephs*	3,646	44.1	−0.4
UKIP	Steven Winstone	2,129	25.8	−5.7
Conservative	Shirley Clayton	1,574	19.0	+5.0
Liberal Democrats	Allan Wisbey	509	6.2	+2.2
Green	Clare Relton	322	3.9	−0.7
TUSC	Maggie Gray	86	1.0	−0.5
Majority		1,517	18.4	+5.4
Turnout		8,266	62.0	+32.4
Labour hold		Swing		

=== Birley ===
Birley
Party	Candidate	Votes	%	±%
Labour	Denise Fox*	3,794	48.1	+2.4
UKIP	Dominic Cook	2,213	28.1	−4.1
Conservative	Calum Heaton	919	11.7	+5.7
Green	Ruth Nicol	459	5.8	−1.9
Liberal Democrats	Wendy Jenrick	438	5.6	−1.7
TUSC	John Voyse	64	0.8	−0.4
Majority		1,581	20.0	+6.5
Turnout		7,887	60.8	+27.8
Labour hold		Swing		

=== Broomhill ===
Broomhill
Party	Candidate	Votes	%	±%
Green	Aodan Marken	3,261	38.3	−5.8
Labour Co-op	Benjamin Miskell	2,766	32.5	+1.5
Liberal Democrats	Sara Sivan-Whitehouse	1,075	12.6	+1.6
Conservative	Andrew Taylor	1,050	12.3	+4.5
UKIP	Pat Sullivan	294	3.5	−1.6
TUSC	Avram Benjamin	70	0.8	−0.2
Majority		495	5.8	−7.3
Turnout		8,516	53.0	+18.0
Green gain from Labour		Swing		

=== Burngreave ===
Burngreave
Party	Candidate	Votes	%	±%
Labour	Ibrar Hussain*	5,507	66.2	+5.6
UKIP	Debra Roberts	1,051	12.6	−4.4
Green	Christopher Sissons	576	6.9	+0.7
Conservative	Russel Cutts	518	6.2	+2.4
TUSC	Maxine Bowler	423	5.1	−3.3
Liberal Democrats	Jan White	244	2.9	+0.1
Majority		4,456	53.6	+10.0
Turnout		8,319	53.0	+19.2
Labour hold		Swing		

=== Central ===
Central
Party	Candidate	Votes	%	±%
Labour Co-op	Lewis Dagnall	3,975	41.3	+2.6
Green	Anne Barr	3,931	40.9	−7.8
Conservative	Raymond Lawrence	846	8.8	+3.3
Liberal Democrats	Muhammad Zahur	459	4.8	+1.3
UKIP	Omer Abdulqader	311	3.2	N/A
TUSC	Sam Morecroft	99	1.0	−0.4
Majority		44	0.5	N/A
Turnout		9,621	55.0	+28.2
Labour gain from Green		Swing		

=== Crookes ===
Crookes
Party	Candidate	Votes	%	±%
Labour	Geoff Smith*	3,818	34.8	+2.7
Liberal Democrats	Harry Matthews	2,965	27.0	−1.0
Green	Julian Briggs	1,868	17.0	−0.4
Conservative	Will Lockwood	1,348	12.3	N/A
UKIP	Andrew Pemberton	847	7.7	−5.1
TUSC	Nick Hall	121	1.1	−0.2
Majority		853	7.8	+3.7
Turnout		10,967	72.3	+24.7
Labour hold		Swing		

=== Darnall ===
Darnall
Party	Candidate	Votes	%	±%
Labour	Dianne Hurst	5,619	61.2	+12.6
UKIP	Muzafar Dahman	1,797	19.6	−5.7
Conservative	Natalie Challenger	776	8.5	+0.2
Green	Joydu Al-Mahfuz	433	4.7	+2.0
Liberal Democrats	Sohail Muhammed	412	4.5	−8.8
TUSC	Philip King	138	1.5	−0.4
Majority		3,822	41.7	+18.4
Turnout		9,175	55.9	+19.9
Labour hold		Swing		

=== Dore & Totley ===
Dore & Totley
Party	Candidate	Votes	%	±%
Liberal Democrats	Joe Otten*	4,513	41.4	+1.8
Conservative	Christopher Pitchfork	2,699	24.8	−1.1
Labour	David Crosby	1,995	18.3	+4.7
UKIP	Jason Sullivan	937	8.6	−5.3
Green	David Applebaum	703	6.5	−0.6
TUSC	Adrian Marshall	42	0.4	N/A
Majority		1,814	16.7	+3.0
Turnout		10,889	79.5	+33.4
Liberal Democrats hold		Swing		

=== East Ecclesfield ===
East Ecclesfield
Party	Candidate	Votes	%	±%
Labour	Steve Wilson*	3,729	40.3	+7.8
UKIP	Jonathan Ogle	2,368	25.6	−10.7
Liberal Democrats	John Bowden	1,390	15.0	−3.9
Conservative	Hilary Gay	1,201	13.0	+6.3
Green	Kaye Horsfield	455	4.9	−0.7
TUSC	Steve Hible	99	1.1	N/A
Majority		1,361	14.7	N/A
Turnout		9,242	64.0	+28.8
Labour hold		Swing		

=== Ecclesall ===
Ecclesall
Party	Candidate	Votes	%	±%
Liberal Democrats	Shaffaq Mohammed	4,172	34.2	−6.6
Labour	Jared O'Mara	3,218	26.4	+3.1
Conservative	Christina Stark	2,074	17.0	+5.6
Green	Jason Leman	1,845	15.1	+0.6
UKIP	Lynsey Lockey	773	6.3	−3.7
TUSC	Adam Fisher	100	0.8	N/A
Majority		954	7.8	−9.7
Turnout		12,182	80.6	+33.7
Liberal Democrats hold		Swing		

=== Firth Park ===
Firth Park
Party	Candidate	Votes	%	±%
Labour	Garry Weatherall	4,282	56.5	+12.0
UKIP	Michael Barge	2,026	26.7	−10.0
Conservative	Judith Burkinshaw	575	7.6	+2.3
Green	Amy Mack	350	4.6	−1.1
Liberal Democrats	Michael Shaw	273	3.6	+0.2
TUSC	Leeroy Moxam	76	1.0	−0.5
Majority		2,256	29.8	+19.0
Turnout		7,582	51.6	+21.5
Labour hold		Swing		

=== Fulwood ===
Fulwood
Party	Candidate	Votes	%	±%
Liberal Democrats	Andrew Sangar*	4,425	40.3	−0.2
Labour	Gareth Slater	2,624	23.9	+5.1
Conservative	Hannah Rose	1,812	16.5	+1.3
Green	Judith Rutnam	1,435	13.1	−2.0
UKIP	Granville Dronfield	636	5.8	−3.4
TUSC	Chris McAndrew	61	0.6	−0.6
Majority		1,801	16.4	−5.3
Turnout		10,993	77.8	+33.7
Liberal Democrats hold		Swing		

=== Gleadless Valley ===
Gleadless Valley
Party	Candidate	Votes	%	±%
Labour	Chris Peace	4,180	46.8	+5.5
Green	Mike Herbert	1,723	19.3	+3.6
UKIP	Mitch Seymour	1,318	14.7	−7.5
Liberal Democrats	Philip Shaddock	771	8.6	+0.9
Conservative	Jenny Grant	758	8.5	+3.2
TUSC	Liz Morton	187	2.1	−2.2
Majority		2,457	27.5	+8.4
Turnout		8,937	60.9	+24.2
Labour hold		Swing		

=== Graves Park ===
Graves Park
Party	Candidate	Votes	%	±%
Liberal Democrats	Ian Auckland*	3,754	38.6	+3.3
Labour	Louise Davies	3,403	34.9	+5.4
Conservative	Henry Grant	1,402	14.4	+8.2
Green	David Hayes	989	10.2	+1.2
TUSC	Keith Endean	190	2.0	+0.2
Majority		351	3.6	−2.2
Turnout		9,738	71.9	+29.2
Liberal Democrats hold		Swing		

=== Hillsborough ===
Hillsborough
Party	Candidate	Votes	%	±%
Labour	Bob Johnson*	4,379	46.2	+3.2
UKIP	John Trow	1,801	19.0	−10.5
Liberal Democrats	Jonathan Harston	1,148	12.1	+0.3
Conservative	Paul Wallace	1,017	10.7	N/A
Green	Chris McMahon	996	10.5	−3.0
TUSC	Victoria Wainwright	132	1.4	−0.8
Majority		2,578	27.2	+13.7
Turnout		9,473	63.9	+26.7
Labour hold		Swing		

=== Manor Castle ===
Manor Castle
Party	Candidate	Votes	%	±%
Labour	Jenny Armstrong*	3,694	57.3	−2.4
UKIP	Jon Butt	1,225	19.0	N/A
Green	Graham Wroe	639	9.9	−6.6
Conservative	Colin Muncie	477	7.4	−0.8
Liberal Democrats	Kurtis Crossland	313	4.9	−0.5
TUSC	Alistair Tice	101	1.6	−8.6
Majority		2,469	38.3	−4.9
Turnout		6,449	47.8	+22.1
Labour hold		Swing		

=== Mosborough ===
Mosborough
Party	Candidate	Votes	%	±%
Labour	David Barker*	3,639	42.4	+2.5
UKIP	Joanne Parkin	2,024	23.6	−7.0
Conservative	David Colton	1,565	18.2	+7.6
Liberal Democrats	Gail Smith	980	11.4	−2.0
Green	Julie White	281	3.3	−1.1
TUSC	Matthew Zion	99	1.2	+0.1
Majority		1,615	18.8	+9.5
Turnout		8,588	62.4	+28.7
Labour hold		Swing		

=== Nether Edge ===
Nether Edge
Party	Candidate	Votes	%	±%
Labour	Mohammad Maroof	3,716	35.3	−4.5
Green	Calvin Payne	3,444	32.7	+9.9
Liberal Democrats	Mohammad Azim	1,775	16.9	−5.8
Conservative	Spencer Pitfield	878	8.3	+2.5
UKIP	Jeffrey Shaw	564	5.4	−1.8
TUSC	James Williams	145	1.4	−0.4
Majority		272	2.6	−14.4
Turnout		10,522	73.4	+26.8
Labour hold		Swing		

=== Richmond ===
Richmond
Party	Candidate	Votes	%	±%
Labour	John Campbell*	3,736	49.1	+4.1
UKIP	Dennis Hobson	2,062	27.1	−9.8
Conservative	Andrew Sneddon	874	11.5	+4.5
Liberal Democrats	Angela Hill	497	6.5	+2.0
Green	Richard Roper	324	4.3	−0.6
TUSC	Claire Wren	111	1.5	−0.1
Majority		1,674	22.0	+13.9
Turnout		7,604	56.8	+25.2
Labour hold		Swing		

=== Shiregreen & Brightside ===
Shiregreen & Brightside
Party	Candidate	Votes	%	±%
Labour	Pete Price*	4,090	53.6	+7.7
UKIP	Joshua Wright	2,246	29.4	−11.0
Conservative	Marcus Wells	651	8.5	+3.0
Green	Scott Darby	376	4.9	−0.5
Liberal Democrats	Jack Weston	267	3.5	+0.7
Majority		1,844	24.2	+18.7
Turnout		7,630	52.6	+21.5
Labour hold		Swing		

=== Southey ===
Southey
Party	Candidate	Votes	%	±%
Labour	Leigh Bramall*	3,507	49.6	+5.2
UKIP	Yvonne Sykes	2,150	30.4	−8.5
Conservative	Jason Southcott	640	9.1	+2.8
Liberal Democrats	Marcus Foster	354	5.0	+1.3
Green	Rose Garratt	330	4.7	−0.2
TUSC	Ashley Cawton	84	1.2	−0.5
Majority		1,357	19.2	+13.7
Turnout		7,065	51.8	+24.4
Labour hold		Swing		

=== Stannington ===
Stannington
Party	Candidate	Votes	%	±%
Liberal Democrats	Vickie Priestley*	3,618	34.0	−5.9
Labour	Lisa Banes	3,188	30.0	+3.0
UKIP	Elizabeth Brownhill	1,765	16.6	−9.0
Conservative	Kath Lawrence	1,225	11.5	N/A
Green	Martin Bradshaw	763	7.2	+0.8
TUSC	Tim Jones	79	0.7	−0.4
Majority		430	4.0	−8.9
Turnout		10,638	63.8	+21.5
Liberal Democrats hold		Swing		

=== Stocksbridge & Upper Don ===
Stocksbridge & Upper Don
Party	Candidate	Votes	%	±%
UKIP	Keith Davis	3,184	33.0	−11.4
Labour	Philip Wood*	3,025	31.3	+9.8
Conservative	Nigel Owen	1,825	18.9	+7.9
Liberal Democrats	Julia Wright	879	9.1	+2.8
Green	Dan Lyons	691	7.2	−0.3
TUSC	Jeremy Short	55	0.6	N/A
Majority		159	1.6	−21.3
Turnout		9,659	61.6	+22.8
UKIP gain from Labour		Swing		

=== Walkley ===
Walkley
Party	Candidate	Votes	%	±%
Labour	Olivia Blake	4,016	41.5	+2.0
Green	Sue Morton	2,299	23.8	−0.3
Liberal Democrats	Diane Leek	1,396	14.4	−4.4
UKIP	Richard Ratcliffe	1,095	11.3	−5.4
Conservative	James Gould	717	7.4	+1.7
TUSC	Chaz Lockett	151	1.6	−1.9
Majority		1,717	17.7	+2.3
Turnout		9,674	64.5	+28.5
Labour hold		Swing		

=== West Ecclesfield ===
West Ecclesfield
Party	Candidate	Votes	%	±%
Labour	Zoe Sykes	3,461	37.0	+4.9
UKIP	David Ogle	2,568	27.5	−9.9
Liberal Democrats	Victoria Bowden	1,477	15.8	−4.6
Conservative	Grace Atkinson	1,393	14.9	N/A
Green	Jon Scaife	405	4.3	−1.1
TUSC	Kate Hutchinson	48	0.5	N/A
Majority		893	9.5	N/A
Turnout		9,352	65.3	+29.3
Labour hold		Swing		

=== Woodhouse ===
Woodhouse
Party	Candidate	Votes	%	±%
Labour	Mick Rooney*	3,992	50.1	+6.2
UKIP	Simon Arnott	2,076	26.0	−12.8
Conservative	Conor Rynne	990	12.4	N/A
Liberal Democrats	Barrie Jervis	442	5.5	−2.7
Green	John Grant	394	4.9	−4.2
TUSC	Ian Whitehouse	80	1.0	N/A
Majority		1,916	24.0	+18.9
Turnout		7,974	59.1	+27.9
Labour hold		Swing		
