= Festival of Debate =

Annual politics festival in South Yorkshire, England

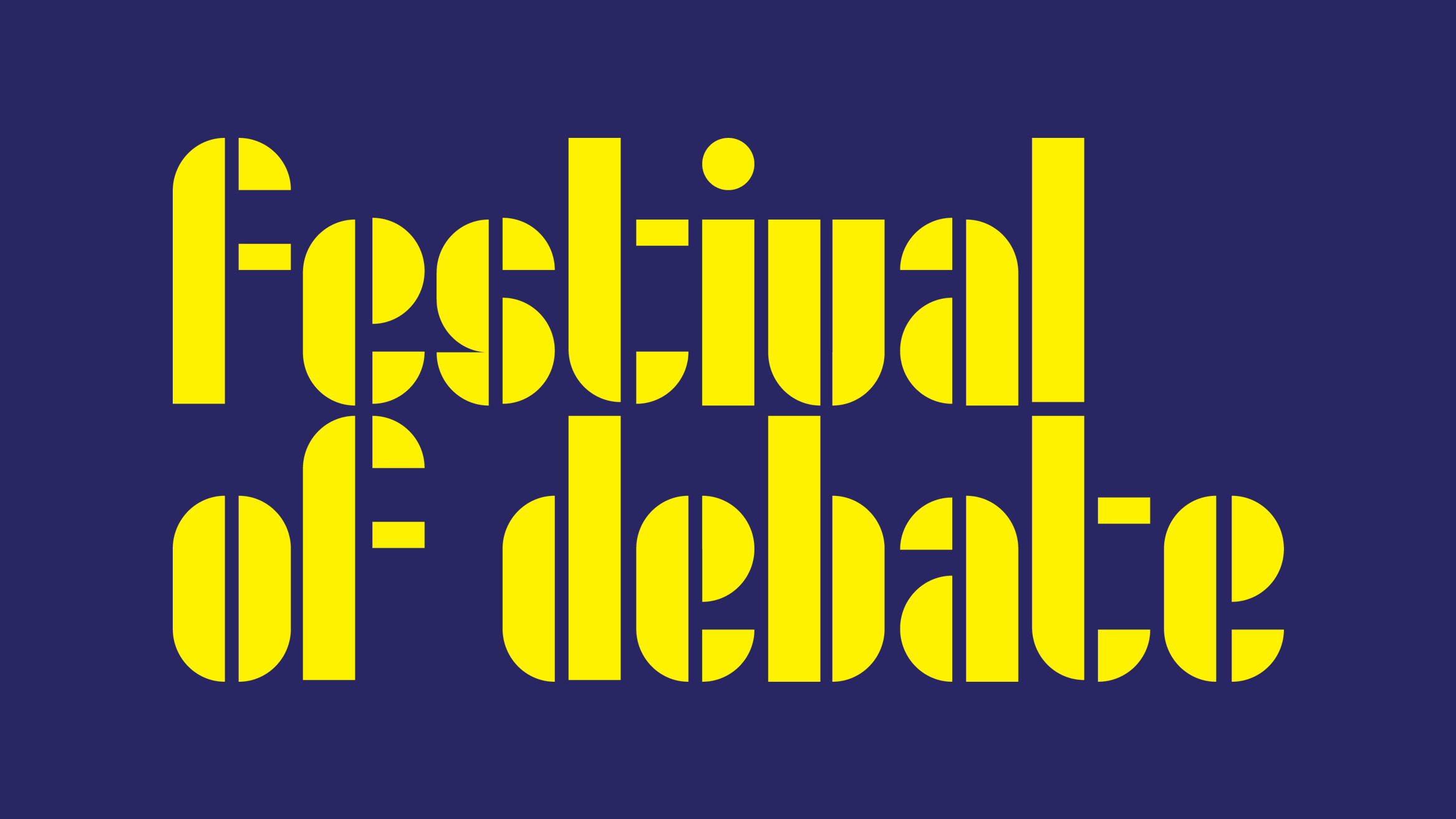

The Festival of Debate is an annual politics festival in England which takes place between May and June across South Yorkshire, but mostly focused in Sheffield. Founded in 2015, organisers say its aim is to "bring people together to share new ideas and lived experience that can help shape our understanding of the world." It is the largest non-partisan politics festival in the UK.

Previous guests have included former leaders of the Labour Party Jeremy Corbyn and Ed Miliband, writer Afua Hirsch, feminist author Gloria Steinem, civil liberties campaigner Shami Chakrabarti, former Greek finance minister Yanis Varoufakis, author and broadcaster Sathnam Sanghera, environmental journalist George Monbiot, composer Brian Eno and writer Armando Iannucci.

The festival was founded in 2015 in the lead-up to that year's UK general election. It is hosted by Opus Independents, a Sheffield-based "not-for-profit independent social enterprise organisation working in culture, politics and the arts". Organisers said the initial aim of the festival was to "engage an increasingly apathetic population with politics".

== List of events ==
Date	Number of events	Notable speakers	Partners and sponsors	Notes
2015		David Blunkett, Matthew Parris		
2016		Jonathan Bartley		
2017		Paul Blomfield, Peter Tatchell		
2018 (18 April – 29 June)	More than 75	Ed Miliband, Ruby Tandoh, Reni Eddo-Lodge, Francesca Martinez, Yanis Varoufakis, Lowkey, Natalie Bennett, Helen Pankhurst		
2019 (19 April to 1 June)	More than 60	George Monbiot, Ash Sarkar, Roger McGough, Afua Hirsch, Shahmir Sanni, James O'Brien, Paul Mason, The Guilty Feminist	The University of Sheffield, Museums Sheffield and Sheffield Theatres	After appearing at the 2019 Festival of Debate, James O'Brien said: "A former EDL member said my show saved his life"
2021 (May and June)	Over 40	Yanis Varoufakis, David Lammy, Maya Goodfellow, Sathnam Sanghera, John McDonnell, Natalie Bennett, David Blunkett, Peter Geoghegan		
2022 (19 April – 31 May)	60 events	Jeremy Corbyn, Armando Iannucci, Shon Faye, Gloria Steinem, Shami Chakrabarti, Led by Donkeys, David Wengrow, Ece Temelkuran, Magid Magid		
2023 (12 April – 26 May)	More than 60	Gary Younge, Brian Eno, General Levy		
2024 (16 April – 25 May)	More than 60	Hollie McNish, Sathnam Sanghera, James O'Brien, Grace Blakeley, Marianna Spring, Sir Michael Marmot, Jackie Kay, George Monbiot, Terrence Higgins Trust		At the 2024 festival, Sathnam Sanghera predicted that the OBE would be renamed the 'Order of British Excellence' "within five years" Sir Michael Marmot said that London's financial power is masking the UK's status as a "poor country"
2025 (22 April – 30 May)		Kate Raworth, Lanre Bakare, Shon Faye, Jason Hickel, John Harris, Joycelyn Longdon, Andy Burnham, Steve Rotheram, Jeremy Corbyn, Laura Bates		2025 will be the tenth year of the festival, and organisers say it will focus on "systemic change and alternative futures"
