= 2016 Sheffield City Council election =

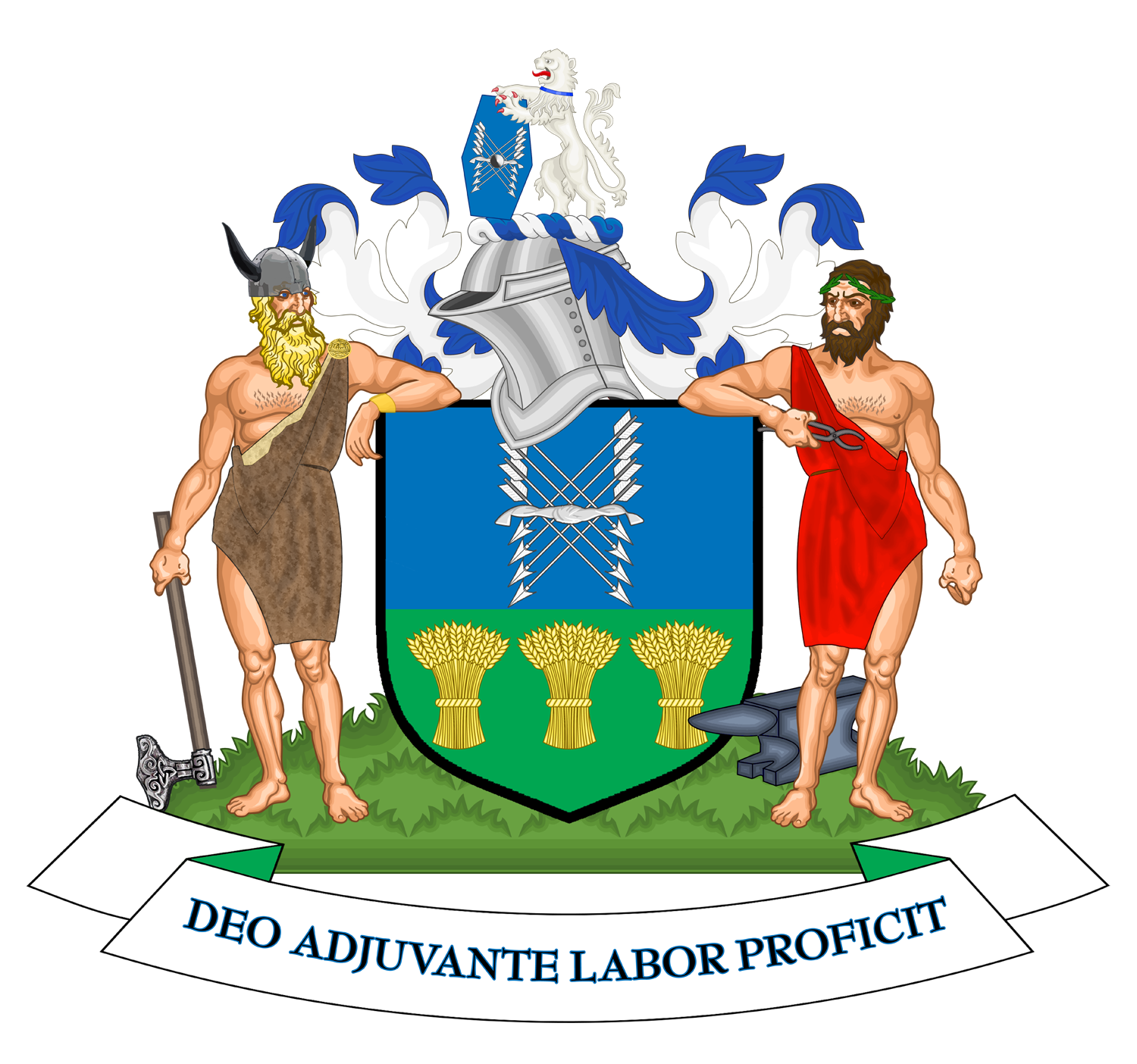
← 2015	5 May 2016	2018 →

All 84 seats to Sheffield City Council 43 seats needed for a majority
	First party	Second party
Party	Labour	Liberal Democrats
Seats won	57	19
Seat change	▼2	▲2
Popular vote	58,099	31,392
Percentage	39.1%	21.1%
Swing	▼2.0%	▲4.6%
	Third party	Fourth party
Party	Green	UKIP
Seats won	4	4
Seat change	0	0
Popular vote	19,921	22,716
Percentage	13.4%	15.3%
Swing	▲1.4%	▼1.5%
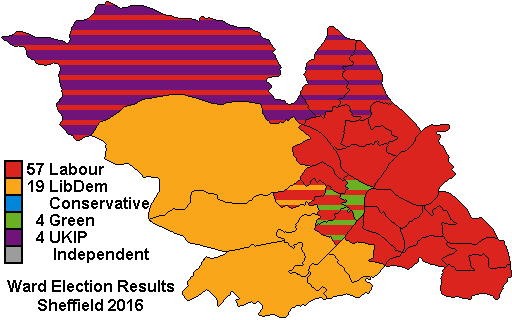
- Map showing the election results. Each ward represents 3 seats, and seats with multiple parties are coloured accordingly.
Majority party before election
Labour
Majority party after election
Labour

Sheffield City Council elections took place on Thursday 5 May 2016, alongside nationwide local elections. All 84 seats were up for election, 3 per ward, after several electoral boundaries were changed. Labour, the Liberal Democrats and the Green Party contested all 84 seats. The Conservatives fielded 55 candidates, UKIP 43, TUSC 23 and Yorkshire First 1. There was also 1 independent candidate. Voters in the Sheffield Brightside and Hillsborough Parliamentary constituency also elected Gill Furniss MP, in a by-election triggered by the death of her husband Harry Harpham MP.

== Election results ==
Sheffield City Council Election Result 2016
Party	Seats	Gains	Losses	Net gain/loss	Seats %	Votes %	Votes	+/−
Labour	57	1	3	-2	67.9	39.1	58,099	-2.0
Liberal Democrats	19	2	0	+2	22.6	21.1	31,392	+4.6
Green	4	1	1	0	4.8	13.4	19,921	+1.4
UKIP	4	0	0	0	4.8	15.3	22,716	-1.5
Conservative	0	0	0	0	0.0	8.4	12,541	-4.1
TUSC	0	0	0	0	0.0	2.1	3,109	+0.9
Yorkshire First	0	0	0	0	0.0	0.3	399	New
Independent	0	0	0	0	0.0	0.2	254	N/A

The result had the following consequences for the total number of seats on the Council after the elections:

Party	Previous council	New council	+/-
Labour	59	57	▼2
Liberal Democrats	17	19	▲2
Green	4	4	0
UKIP	4	4	0
Total	84	84	
Working majority	34	30	

== Retiring councillors ==
=== Labour ===
- Ibrar Hussain, Burngreave
- Geoff Smith, Crookes
- Sheila Constance, Firth Park
- Steve Jones, Gleadless Valley
- Jenny Armstrong, Manor Castle
- Nikki Bond, Nether Edge
- John Campbell, Richmond
- Lynn Rooney, Richmond
- Gill Furniss, Southey
- Ray Satur, Woodhouse

=== Liberal Democrats ===
- Rob Frost, Crookes
- Katie Condliffe, Stannington

=== Greens ===
- Sarah Jane Smalley, Central

== Ward results ==
=== Beauchief & Greenhill ===
Richard Shaw, Julie Gledhill and Roy Munn were sitting Beauchief & Greenhill councillors.

Beauchief & Greenhill
Party	Candidate	Votes	%	±%
Liberal Democrats	Bob Pullin	2,369	42.3	
Liberal Democrats	Richard Shaw*	2,322	41.5	
Liberal Democrats	Andy Nash	2,300	41.1	
Labour	Julie Gledhill*	1,818	32.5	
Labour	Roy Munn*	1,771	31.6	
Labour	John Kirby	1,478	26.4	
UKIP	Andrew Telford	688	12.3	
UKIP	Jean Simpson	673	12.0	
Green	Catherine Hartley	393	7.0	
Conservative	Andy Taylor	344	6.1	
Green	Paul Horada-Bradnum	318	5.7	
Green	Rita Wilcock	284	5.1	
Conservative	John Scotting	268	4.8	
Conservative	Peter Morris	255	4.6	
TUSC	Terry Murphy	124	2.2	
Majority		482	8.6	
Turnout		5,615	39	
Liberal Democrats hold		Swing		
Liberal Democrats gain from Labour		Swing		
Liberal Democrats gain from Labour		Swing		

=== Beighton ===
Helen Mirfin-Boukouris, Ian Saunders and Chris Rosling-Josephs were sitting Beighton councillors.

Beighton
Party	Candidate	Votes	%	±%
Labour	Helen Mirfin-Boukouris*	1,962	50.7	
Labour	Ian Saunders*	1,947	50.3	
Labour	Chris Rosling-Josephs*	1,704	44.0	
UKIP	Brett Colk	1,154	29.8	
Conservative	Shirley Diane Clayton	777	20.1	
Liberal Democrats	Sophie Thornton	253	6.5	
Liberal Democrats	Richard Sangar	249	6.4	
Green	Richard Madden	239	6.2	
Green	Clare Relton	239	6.2	
Liberal Democrats	Allan Wisbey	209	5.4	
Green	Kiri Smith	151	3.9	
TUSC	Margaret Gray	141	3.6	
Majority		550	14.2	
Turnout		3,887	28	
Labour hold		Swing		
Labour hold		Swing		
Labour hold		Swing		

=== Birley ===
Bryan Lodge, Denise Fox and Karen McGowan were sitting Birley councillors.

Birley
Party	Candidate	Votes	%	±%
Labour	Bryan Lodge*	1,912	51.0	
Labour	Denise Fox*	1,861	49.7	
Labour	Karen McGowan*	1,719	45.9	
UKIP	Bradley Colk	960	25.6	
UKIP	Dennis Hobson	931	24.8	
Conservative	Calum Heaton	387	10.3	
Liberal Democrats	Jane Chapman	325	8.7	
Green	Anthony Naylor	310	8.3	
Liberal Democrats	Andrew Dixon	281	7.5	
Green	Ruth Nicol	245	6.5	
Green	Alan Yearsley	231	6.2	
Liberal Democrats	Hilda Wisbey	185	4.9	
TUSC	John Voyse	83	2.2	
Majority		759	20.3	
Turnout		3,758	29	
Labour hold		Swing		
Labour hold		Swing		
Labour hold		Swing		

=== Broomhill & Sharrow Vale ===
Aodan Marken and Brian Webster were sitting Broomhill councillors.

Broomhill & Sharrow Vale
Party	Candidate	Votes	%	±%
Labour	Michelle Cook	1,956	40.9	
Green	Magid Magid	1,882	39.3	
Labour	Kieran Harpham	1,860	38.9	
Labour	Saleh Alnoud	1,771	37.0	
Green	Aodan Marken*	1,734	36.2	
Green	Brian Webster*	1,657	34.6	
Liberal Democrats	Barbara Masters	587	12.3	
Liberal Democrats	Iain Prest	522	10.9	
Liberal Democrats	Kurtis Crossland	459	9.6	
Conservative	Chris Hallam	356	7.4	
Conservative	Toby Abbs	344	7.2	
Conservative	Michael Ginn	276	5.8	
UKIP	Pat Sullivan	213	4.5	
TUSC	Bridget Gilbert	120	2.5	
Majority		89	1.9	
Turnout		4,800	32	
Labour hold		Swing		
Green hold		Swing		
Labour gain from Green		Swing		

=== Burngreave ===
Jackie Drayton and Talib Hussain were sitting Burngreave councillors.

Burngreave
Party	Candidate	Votes	%	±%
Labour	Jackie Drayton*	3,483	67.2	
Labour	Talib Hussain*	3,228	62.3	
Labour	Mark Jones	2,784	53.7	
UKIP	Ashish Bhandari	539	10.4	
Green	Mobeen Arshad	506	9.8	
Liberal Democrats	Iltaf Hussain	441	8.5	
Green	Stephanie Windle	417	8.0	
Green	Chris Sissons	399	7.7	
Liberal Democrats	Mubarak Ismail	377	7.3	
Liberal Democrats	Shelley Cockayne	324	6.2	
Conservative	Russell Cutts	284	5.5	
Conservative	Timothy Marsh	198	3.8	
Conservative	Alexander Taylor	181	3.5	
Majority		2,245	43.3	
Turnout		5,211	37	
Labour hold		Swing		
Labour hold		Swing		
Labour hold		Swing		

=== City ===
Robert Murphy was a sitting Central councillor.

City
Party	Candidate	Votes	%	±%
Green	Douglas Johnson	708	48.8	
Green	Robert Murphy*	626	43.2	
Labour	Moya O'Rourke	617	42.6	
Green	Declan Paul Walsh	592	40.8	
Labour	Gareth Slater	581	40.1	
Labour	Amar Ilyas	547	37.7	
Liberal Democrats	Anders Hanson	147	10.1	
Liberal Democrats	David Frederick Chapman	116	8.0	
Conservative	Raymond Lawrence	107	7.4	
Liberal Democrats	Muhammad Zahur	78	5.4	
TUSC	Sam Morecroft	47	3.2	
Majority		25	1.8	
Turnout		1,456	20	
Green hold		Swing		
Green hold		Swing		
Labour hold		Swing		

=== Crookes & Crosspool ===
Anne Murphy was a sitting Crookes councillor.

Crookes & Crosspool
Party	Candidate	Votes	%	±%
Labour	Anne Murphy*	2,713	41.4	
Liberal Democrats	Adam Patrick Hanrahan	2,573	39.2	
Labour	Craig Gamble-Pugh	2,180	33.2	
Labour	Rosemary Telfer	2,108	32.1	
Liberal Democrats	Mohammed Mahroof	1,986	30.3	
Liberal Democrats	Gail Alice Smith	1,976	30.1	
Green	Peter Garbutt	1,375	21.0	
Green	Rose Garratt	989	15.1	
Green	Logan Robin	809	12.3	
UKIP	Elizabeth Mary Brownhill	613	9.3	
Conservative	Joe McNeillie	480	7.3	
Conservative	Edward Reeves	409	6.2	
Conservative	Miles Waters	288	4.4	
TUSC	Nicholas Pater Pearson Hall	113	1.7	
Majority		72	1.2	
Turnout		6,573	47	
Labour hold		Swing		
Liberal Democrats hold		Swing		
Labour hold		Swing		

=== Darnall ===
Mazher Iqbal and Mary Lea were sitting Darnall councillors.

Darnall
Party	Candidate	Votes	%	±%
Labour	Mazher Iqbal*	2,806	65.0	
Labour	Mary Lea*	2,672	61.9	
Labour	Zahira Naz	2,423	56.2	
UKIP	Peter William O'Brien	690	16.0	
UKIP	Nigel Terence James	655	15.2	
UKIP	Matthew John Priest	606	14.0	
Liberal Democrats	Sohail Shaffaq Mohammed	285	6.6	
Green	Joydu Al-Mahfuz	247	5.7	
Liberal Democrats	Pauline Susan Memmott	216	5.0	
Conservative	Richard Blyth	191	4.4	
Green	Kathy Aston	186	4.3	
Liberal Democrats	Janet Frances Shaddock	186	4.3	
Green	Eamonn Charles Ward	116	2.7	
TUSC	Phil King	82	1.9	
Majority		1,733	40.2	
Turnout		4,324	33	
Labour hold		Swing		
Labour hold		Swing		
Labour hold		Swing		

=== Dore & Totley ===
Colin Ross, Joe Otten and Martin Smith were sitting Dore & Totley councillors.

Dore & Totley
Party	Candidate	Votes	%	±%
Liberal Democrats	Colin Arthur Ross*	3,875	56.2	
Liberal Democrats	Joe Otten*	3,547	51.4	
Liberal Democrats	Martin Richard Smith*	3,391	49.1	
Conservative	Kath Lawrence	1,320	19.1	
Conservative	Christopher Pitchfork	1,247	18.1	
Labour	David Crosby	1,072	15.5	
Labour	Maggie Ewan	966	14.0	
Conservative	Marcus Wells	846	12.3	
Labour	Mohamadi Fouad Al	752	10.9	
UKIP	Tebb Clare Wallis	619	9.0	
Green	David Applebaum	578	8.4	
Green	Gill Black	432	6.3	
Green	Julian Briggs	288	4.2	
Majority		2,071	30.0	
Turnout		6,907	47	
Liberal Democrats hold		Swing		
Liberal Democrats hold		Swing		
Liberal Democrats hold		Swing		

=== East Ecclesfield ===
Steve Wilson and Pauline Andrews were sitting East Ecclesfield councillors. Sioned-Mair Richards was a sitting Shiregreen & Brightside councillor.

East Ecclesfield
Party	Candidate	Votes	%	±%
Labour	Andy Bainbridge	1,919	40.8	
Labour	Steve Wilson*	1,558	33.1	
UKIP	Pauline Andrews*	1,531	32.5	
Labour	Sioned-Mair Richards*	1,493	31.7	
UKIP	Anthea Brownrigg	1,388	29.5	
UKIP	John Brownrigg	1,383	29.4	
Liberal Democrats	Kate Guest	811	17.2	
Liberal Democrats	John Housley	801	17.0	
Liberal Democrats	Alan Hooper	635	13.5	
Conservative	Adam James Allcroft	506	10.8	
Green	Louise Amanda Dunk	286	6.1	
Green	Kaye Horsfield	269	5.7	
Green	David Dike	164	3.5	
TUSC	Steven Paul Hible	86	1.8	
Majority		38	0.8	
Turnout		4,719	33	
Labour hold		Swing		
Labour hold		Swing		
UKIP hold		Swing		

=== Ecclesall ===
Roger Davison and Shaffaq Mohammed were sitting Ecclesall councillors.

Ecclesall
Party	Candidate	Votes	%	±%
Liberal Democrats	Roger Noel Davison*	3,439	44.6	
Liberal Democrats	Paul James Scriven	3,164	41.0	
Liberal Democrats	Shaffaq Mohammed*	2,787	36.1	
Labour	Alison Freeman	2,369	30.7	
Labour	Kevan Rushton	1,849	24.0	
Labour	Chris Olewicz	1,794	23.2	
Green	Stewart John Clifford Kemp	1,517	19.7	
Green	Emily Forster	1,171	15.2	
Green	Jason Leman	821	10.6	
Conservative	Roger Barnsley	791	10.2	
Conservative	John Westley Chapman	720	9.3	
Conservative	Daniel Johnson	574	7.4	
UKIP	John Douglas Lowcock	514	6.7	
TUSC	Roan Alexander James	108	1.4	
Majority		418	5.4	
Turnout		7,732	49	
Liberal Democrats hold		Swing		
Liberal Democrats hold		Swing		
Liberal Democrats hold		Swing		

=== Firth Park ===
Alan Law was a sitting Firth Park councillor.

Firth Park
Party	Candidate	Votes	%	±%
Labour	Alan Law*	2,424	59.1	
Labour	Abdul Khayum	1,916	46.7	
Labour	Abtisam Mohamed	1,844	45.0	
UKIP	Anis Abdullah	752	18.3	
UKIP	Ishleen Oberoi	622	15.2	
UKIP	Muzafar Rahman	577	14.1	
Green	Amy Catherine Mack	443	10.8	
Green	Sara-Jayne Hill	305	7.4	
Conservative	Judith R Burkinshaw	302	7.4	
Liberal Democrats	Fiona Clayton	269	6.6	
Green	Chris Pyke	246	6.0	
Conservative	George Roy Ledbury	239	5.8	
Liberal Democrats	Jack Weston	229	5.6	
Conservative	June Beryl Ledbury	198	4.8	
Liberal Democrats	Clare Green	190	4.6	
Majority		1,092	26.7	
Turnout		4,132	29	
Labour hold		Swing		
Labour hold		Swing		
Labour hold		Swing		

=== Fulwood ===
Sue Alston, Andrew Sangar and Cliff Woodcraft were sitting Fulwood councillors.

Fulwood
Party	Candidate	Votes	%	±%
Liberal Democrats	Sue Alston*	3,388	56.2	
Liberal Democrats	Andrew Paul Sangar*	3,112	51.6	
Liberal Democrats	Cliff Woodcraft*	3,063	50.8	
Labour	Lizzie Ellen	1,390	23.0	
Labour	Hafeas Rehman	1,121	18.6	
Labour	Abbas Shah	1,033	17.1	
Green	Judith Fiona Rutnam	711	11.8	
Green	Jon Ashe	691	11.5	
Conservative	Pat Barnsley	642	10.6	
Conservative	Tom Williams	578	9.6	
Green	Bev Cross	531	8.8	
Conservative	Philippa Bartlett	528	8.8	
UKIP	Granville Dronfield	384	6.4	
TUSC	Christopher Patrick McAndrew	65	1.1	
Majority		1,673	27.8	
Turnout		6,045	43	
Liberal Democrats hold		Swing		
Liberal Democrats hold		Swing		
Liberal Democrats hold		Swing		

=== Gleadless Valley ===
Lewis Dagnall was a sitting Central councillor, Chris Peace and Cate McDonald were sitting Gleadless Valley councillors.

Gleadless Valley
Party	Candidate	Votes	%	±%
Labour	Lewis Dagnall*	2,348	56.7	
Labour	Chris Peace*	2,347	56.7	
Labour	Cate McDonald*	2,235	54.0	
Green	Jo Eckersley	1,074	25.9	
Green	Clare Jones	865	20.9	
UKIP	Mitchell Seymour	697	16.8	
Green	Ben Manovitch	665	16.1	
Liberal Democrats	Simon William Clement-Jones	591	14.3	
Liberal Democrats	John Dryden	523	12.6	
Liberal Democrats	Philip Arthur Shaddock	507	12.2	
Conservative	James Clark	350	8.5	
TUSC	Elizabeth Joan Morton	257	6.2	
Majority		1,161	28.1	
Turnout		4,146	30	
Labour hold		Swing		
Labour hold		Swing		
Labour hold		Swing		

=== Graves Park ===
Ian Auckland and Steve Ayris were sitting Graves Park councillors.

Graves Park
Party	Candidate	Votes	%	±%
Liberal Democrats	Ian Auckland*	2,889	53.2	
Liberal Democrats	Susan Elaine Auckland	2,627	48.4	
Liberal Democrats	Steve Ayris*	2,374	43.7	
Labour	Mary Bishop	1,730	31.9	
Labour	Andy Belfield	1,520	28.0	
Labour	Steven Surgeon	1,153	21.2	
Green	David Maurice Hayes	684	12.6	
Conservative	Trevor Henry Grant	448	8.3	
Green	Bongai Fumhanda	391	7.2	
Green	Soo Vinnicombe	343	6.3	
TUSC	Keith Raymond Endean	235	4.3	
Majority		644	11.8	
Turnout		5,469	41	
Liberal Democrats hold		Swing		
Liberal Democrats hold		Swing		
Liberal Democrats hold		Swing		

=== Hillsborough ===
Bob Johnson, George Lindars-Hammond and Josie Paszek were sitting Hillsborough councillors.

Hillsborough
Party	Candidate	Votes	%	±%
Labour	Bob Johnson*	2,998	53.3	
Labour	George Lindars-Hammond*	2,328	41.4	
Labour	Josie Paszek*	2,312	41.1	
UKIP	Chris Bennett	1,216	21.6	
Green	Margaret Anne Evans	929	16.5	
Green	Christine Gilligan Kubo	707	12.6	
Green	Alex Fenton-Thomas	705	12.5	
Liberal Democrats	Mary Perpetua Aston	654	11.6	
Liberal Democrats	John Simon Knight	615	10.9	
Liberal Democrats	Eilidh Pattie	515	9.2	
Conservative	Natalie Challanger	445	7.9	
Conservative	David John Harrison	400	7.1	
Conservative	Paul Anthony Wallace	297	5.3	
TUSC	Victoria Judith Wainwright	190	3.4	
Majority		1,096	19.5	
Turnout		5,643	38	
Labour hold		Swing		
Labour hold		Swing		
Labour hold		Swing		

=== Manor Castle ===
Pat Midgley and Terry Fox were sitting Manor Castle councillors.

Manor Castle
Party	Candidate	Votes	%	±%
Labour	Pat Midgley*	1,778	58.0	
Labour	Lisa Banes	1,593	52.0	
Labour	Terry Fox*	1,523	49.7	
Green	Graham Stephen Wroe	591	19.3	
Green	Susi Liles	436	14.2	
Yorkshire First	Jack Carrington	399	13.0	
Green	Malcolm Liles	382	12.5	
Liberal Democrats	Kyle Crossland	302	9.9	
Conservative	Kane Holden	240	7.8	
TUSC	Alistair Tice	227	7.4	
Liberal Democrats	Philip Richard Jarvest	197	6.4	
Liberal Democrats	Tim Urry	167	5.4	
Majority		932	30.4	
Turnout		3,078	23	
Labour hold		Swing		
Labour hold		Swing		
Labour hold		Swing		

=== Mosborough ===
Tony Downing, David Barker and Isobel Bowler were sitting Mosborough councillors, Denise Reaney was a sitting Graves Park councillor.

Mosborough
Party	Candidate	Votes	%	±%
Labour	Tony Downing*	1,992	49.0	
Labour	David Barker*	1,833	45.1	
Labour	Isobel Bowler*	1,661	40.8	
UKIP	Joanne Elizabeth Parkin	1,022	25.1	
UKIP	Adrian Simpson	831	20.4	
Conservative	Alexandra Boman-Flavell	646	15.9	
Liberal Democrats	Chris Brown	636	15.6	
Liberal Democrats	Denise Reaney*	586	14.4	
Liberal Democrats	Rachael Anne Brown	532	13.1	
TUSC	Matthew Zion Green	159	3.9	
Green	Julie Anne White	142	3.5	
Green	David Mathews Smith	138	3.4	
Green	Anwen Fryer	122	3.0	
Majority		639	15.7	
Turnout		4,079	30	
Labour hold		Swing		
Labour hold		Swing		
Labour hold		Swing		

=== Nether Edge & Sharrow ===
Nasima Akther and Mohammad Maroof were sitting Nether Edge councillors.

Nether Edge & Sharrow
Party	Candidate	Votes	%	±%
Labour	Nasima Akther*	2,850	41.7	
Labour	Mohammad Maroof*	2,646	38.7	
Green	Alison Clare Teal	2,563	37.5	
Labour	Rosie Carter-Rich	2,555	37.4	
Green	Rob Cole	2,403	35.1	
Green	Steve Barnard	2,231	32.6	
Liberal Democrats	Shahid Ali	1,091	16.0	
Liberal Democrats	Mohammad Azim	904	13.2	
Liberal Democrats	Patricia Ann White	796	11.6	
Conservative	Laurence Smith	294	4.3	
UKIP	Jeffrey Stephen Shaw	274	4.0	
Independent	Calvin Mark Payne	254	3.7	
TUSC	James Peter Robert Williams	146	2.1	
Majority		8	0.1	
Turnout		6,843	47	
Labour hold		Swing		
Labour hold		Swing		
Green gain from Labour		Swing		

=== Park & Arbourthorne ===
Julie Dore and Jack Scott were sitting Park & Arbourthorne councillors.

Park & Arbourthorne
Party	Candidate	Votes	%	±%
Labour	Julie Dore*	1,962	56.5	
Labour	Ben Miskell	1,639	47.2	
Labour	Jack Scott*	1,497	43.1	
UKIP	Dennise Ann Dawson	993	28.6	
Green	Jen Barnard	449	12.9	
Conservative	Francis Henry Woodger	385	11.1	
Liberal Democrats	Ann Patricia Kingdom	355	10.2	
Green	Lyuba Ilieva Herbert	316	9.1	
Liberal Democrats	Mike Reynolds	308	8.9	
Liberal Democrats	Susan Elizabeth Ross	268	7.7	
Green	Edward Gordon Squires	253	7.3	
TUSC	Kristopher Connor Barker	220	6.3	
Majority		504	14.5	
Turnout		3,481	27	
Labour hold		Swing		
Labour hold		Swing		
Labour hold		Swing		

=== Richmond ===
Mike Drabble was a sitting Arbourthorne councillor, Dianne Hurst was a sitting Darnall councillor, Peter Rippon was a sitting Shiregreen & Brightside councillor.

Richmond
Party	Candidate	Votes	%	±%
Labour	Mike Drabble*	2,177	56.3	
Labour	Dianne Hurst*	1,963	50.7	
Labour	Peter Rippon*	1,667	43.1	
UKIP	Mike Simpson	1,106	28.6	
Conservative	Harry Knowles	420	10.9	
Conservative	Andrew James Sneddon	407	10.5	
Liberal Democrats	Fiona Alison Bailey-Smith	314	8.1	
Liberal Democrats	Angela Margaret Hill	285	7.4	
Green	Amy Vanessa Benson	279	7.2	
Liberal Democrats	Jenifer Frances Yeoman Pennell	256	6.6	
Green	Rachel Hope	213	5.5	
TUSC	Rosie Kathleen Mayes	209	5.4	
Green	Nick Nuttgens	179	4.6	
Majority		561	14.5	
Turnout		3,873	26.4	
Labour hold		Swing		
Labour hold		Swing		
Labour hold		Swing		

=== Shiregreen & Brightside ===
Peter Price was a sitting Shiregreen & Brightside councillor, Garry Weatherall was a sitting Firth Park councillor.

Shiregreen & Brightside
Party	Candidate	Votes	%	±%
Labour	Peter Price*	2,273	56.3	
Labour	Dawn Dale	2,203	54.6	
Labour	Garry Weatherall*	1,746	43.3	
UKIP	Richard John Matthewman	1,080	26.8	
UKIP	Steven Dominic Winstone	915	22.7	
Conservative	David Colton	324	8.0	
Green	Deborah Jane Chadbourn	275	6.8	
Liberal Democrats	Chris Tosseano	196	4.9	
Liberal Democrats	Joe Harris	194	4.8	
Green	Katherine Rosemary Myles	185	4.6	
Conservative	Daniel James Harrison	168	4.2	
Liberal Democrats	Laura Elizabeth Pope	164	4.1	
Conservative	Edward Davey	163	4.0	
Green	Milton John Pennefather	130	3.2	
Majority		666	16.5	
Turnout		4,048	29	
Labour hold		Swing		
Labour hold		Swing		
Labour hold		Swing		

=== Southey ===
Tony Damms and Leigh Bramall were sitting Southey councillors, Jayne Dunn was a sitting Broomhill councillor.

Southey
Party	Candidate	Votes	%	±%
Labour	Tony Damms*	2,014	52.0	
Labour	Leigh Bramall*	1,926	49.8	
Labour	Jayne Dunn*	1,834	47.4	
UKIP	Adele Paula Andrews	1,173	30.3	
UKIP	Yvonne Sheila Sykes	908	23.5	
UKIP	Marina Round	820	21.2	
Liberal Democrats	Mavis Butler	204	5.3	
Green	Andrew Philip Hards	192	5.0	
Conservative	James Edward Gould	191	4.9	
Conservative	Jason Southcott	176	4.5	
Liberal Democrats	Peter Frank Butler	171	4.4	
Green	David Paul Fox-Meakin	167	4.3	
Conservative	Carl McHugh	158	4.1	
Liberal Democrats	Jan White	143	3.7	
Green	Heather Jane Rostron	121	3.1	
TUSC	William Hornett	61	1.6	
Majority		661	17.1	
Turnout		3,886	28	
Labour hold		Swing		
Labour hold		Swing		
Labour hold		Swing		

=== Stannington ===
David Baker and Vickie Priestley were sitting Stannington councillors, Penny Baker was a sitting Ecclesall councillor.

Stannington
Party	Candidate	Votes	%	±%
Liberal Democrats	David Walton Baker*	2,665	47.1	
Liberal Democrats	Penny Baker*	2,524	44.6	
Liberal Democrats	Vickie Priestley*	2,332	41.2	
Labour	James Bangert	1,446	25.6	
Labour	Jayne Hawley	1,434	25.3	
Labour	Max Telfer	1,281	22.6	
UKIP	Shane Harper	1,047	18.5	
Green	Martin Keith Bradshaw	500	8.8	
Green	Melanie Kay	394	7.0	
Conservative	Lesley Blyth	351	6.2	
Conservative	Mark Thomas Finney	345	6.1	
Green	Christine Kellond	338	6.0	
Conservative	Alex Christakou	249	4.4	
TUSC	Jeremy John Short	117	2.1	
Majority		886	15.6	
Turnout		5,669	39	
Liberal Democrats hold		Swing		
Liberal Democrats hold		Swing		
Liberal Democrats hold		Swing		

=== Stocksbridge & Upper Don ===
Jack Clarkson, Keith Davis and Richard Crowther were sitting Stocksbridge & Upper Don councillors, Katie Condliffe was a sitting Stannington councillor.

Stocksbridge & Upper Don
Party	Candidate	Votes	%	±%
UKIP	Jack Clarkson*	2,097	41.7	
UKIP	Keith Davis*	1,952	38.8	
Labour	Richard Crowther*	1,688	33.5	
UKIP	Graeme Boyd Waddicar	1,685	33.5	
Labour	Julie Grocutt	1,668	33.1	
Labour	Phil Wood	1,534	30.5	
Conservative	Nigel John Geoffrey Owen	699	13.9	
Liberal Democrats	Katie Condliffe*	574	11.4	
Green	Angela Roberts	448	8.9	
Green	Dan Lyons	430	8.5	
Liberal Democrats	Julie Alexandra Wright	376	7.5	
Liberal Democrats	Shoshana Howard	355	7.1	
Green	Columba Elizabeth Timmins	197	3.9	
TUSC	Joseph Addy Dawes	59	1.2	
Majority		3	0.1	
Turnout		5,043	35	
UKIP hold		Swing		
UKIP hold		Swing		
Labour hold		Swing		

=== Walkley ===
Olivia Blake, Ben Curran and Neale Gibson were sitting Walkley councillors.

Walkley
Party	Candidate	Votes	%	±%
Labour	Olivia Blake*	2,686	49.5	
Labour	Ben Curran*	2,459	45.3	
Labour	Neale Gibson*	2,213	40.8	
Green	Sue Morton	1,877	34.6	
Green	Liam Hardy	1,218	22.5	
Green	Chris McMahon	1,164	21.5	
Liberal Democrats	Diane Wainwright Leek	837	15.4	
UKIP	Richard John Ratcliffe	681	12.6	
Liberal Democrats	Jonathan Graham Harston	657	12.1	
Liberal Democrats	Clare Brown	565	10.4	
Conservative	Alastair Geddes	346	6.4	
TUSC	Avram Misha Warren Benjamin	166	3.1	
Majority		336	6.2	
Turnout		5,446	35	
Labour hold		Swing		
Labour hold		Swing		
Labour hold		Swing		

=== West Ecclesfield ===
Adam Hurst, John Booker and Zoe Sykes were sitting West Ecclesfield councillors.

West Ecclesfield
Party	Candidate	Votes	%	±%
Labour	Adam Hurst*	1,675	35.1	
UKIP	John Charles Booker*	1,651	34.6	
Labour	Zoe Sykes*	1,507**	31.5	
UKIP	David Ogle	1,506	31.5	
UKIP	Jonathan Ogle	1,390	29.1	
Labour	Jared O'Mara	1,218	25.5	
Liberal Democrats	Michael Levery	1,020	21.3	
Liberal Democrats	Victoria Margaret Bowden	1,000	20.9	
Liberal Democrats	John Cyril Bowden	998	20.9	
Conservative	Grace Margaret Atkinson	526	11.0	
Green	Jonathan Patrick Scaife	308	6.4	
Green	Jemima Perry	244	5.1	
Green	Gemma Lock	176	3.7	
Majority		0	0.0	
Turnout		4,787	34	
Labour hold		Swing		
UKIP hold		Swing		
Labour hold		Swing		

- Zoe Sykes won on a drawing of lots, shown as gaining an addition vote.

=== Woodhouse ===
Michael Rooney and Jackie Satur were sitting Woodhouse councillors, Paul Wood was a sitting Richmond councillor.

Woodhouse
Party	Candidate	Votes	%	±%
Labour	Michael Rooney*	2,041	54.2	
Labour	Jackie Satur*	1,790	47.5	
Labour	Paul Wood*	1,696	45.0	
UKIP	Dennis Hobson	1,022	27.1	
UKIP	John-Daniel Marshall	856	22.7	
Green	John Francis Grant	415	11.0	
Conservative	Andrew George Farkas	389	10.3	
Liberal Democrats	Clare Acton	302	8.0	
Green	Victoria Jayne Horrocks	205	5.4	
Liberal Democrats	Sara Charlotte Sivan-Whitehouse	202	5.4	
Liberal Democrats	Alan Edward Whitehouse	185	4.9	
Green	James Robert Baynton Starky	180	4.8	
TUSC	Ian Whitehouse	94	2.5	
Majority		674	17.9	
Turnout		3,781	28	
Labour hold		Swing		
Labour hold		Swing		
Labour hold		Swing		

== By-elections between 2016 and 2018 ==
=== Mosborough ===
Death of Labour Cllr Isobel Bowler.

Mosborough by-election, 8 September 2016
Party	Candidate	Votes	%	±%
Liberal Democrats	Gail Smith	1,711	45.6	+30.0
Labour	Julie Grocutt	1,279	34.1	−6.7
UKIP	Joanne Parkin	466	12.4	−12.7
Conservative	Andrew Taylor	229	6.1	−9.8
Green	Julie White	67	1.8	−1.7
Majority		432	11.5	N/A
Turnout		3,752	27.2	−2.8
Liberal Democrats gain from Labour		Swing		

=== Southey ===
Resignation of Labour Cllr Leigh Bramall.

Southey by-election, 4 May 2017
Party	Candidate	Votes	%	±%
Labour	Mike Chaplin	1,594	46.0	−3.8
Liberal Democrats	Philip Brown	706	20.4	+15.1
UKIP	Dave Ogle	593	17.1	−13.2
Conservative	Jason Southcott	388	11.2	+6.7
Green	Andrew Hards	97	2.8	−2.2
Yorkshire	Jim Warrender	46	1.3	N/A
Women's Equality	Carol Keen	40	1.2	N/A
Majority		888	25.6	+8.5
Turnout		3,469	24.8	−3.2
Labour hold		Swing		

=== Nether Edge and Sharrow ===
Resignation of Labour Cllr Nasima Akther.

Nether Edge and Sharrow by-election, 22 June 2017
Party	Candidate	Votes	%	±%
Labour	Jim Steinke	2,641	45.0	+3.3
Green	Rob Unwin	2,509	42.7	+7.6
Liberal Democrats	Shahid Ali	722	12.3	−3.7
Majority		132	2.3	N/A
Turnout		5,872	37.26	−10
Labour hold		Swing		

=== Beighton ===
Resignation of Labour Cllr Helen Mirfin-Boukouris.

Beighton by-election, 12 October 2017
Party	Candidate	Votes	%	±%
Labour	Sophie Wilson	1,640	48.6	−2.1
Liberal Democrats	Bob McCann	899	26.6	+20.1
Conservative	Laurence Smith	552	16.3	−3.8
UKIP	Shane Harper	212	6.3	−23.5
Green	Richard Naylor	74	2.2	−4.0
Majority		741	22.0	+7.8
Turnout		3,381	23.8	−4.2
Labour hold		Swing		
