= Walkley (ward) =

Electoral ward in the City of Sheffield, South Yorkshire, England

Coordinates: 53.393°N 1.514°W

- Shown within Sheffield
- Population: 21,793
- Metropolitan borough: City of Sheffield
- Metropolitan county: South Yorkshire
- Region: Yorkshire and the Humber
- Country: England
- Sovereign state: United Kingdom
- UK Parliament: Sheffield Central
- Councillors: John Wright (Labour Party); Laura Maclean (Labour Party); Andy Davies (Green Party)

Walkley is an electoral ward in Sheffield, South Yorkshire, England.

Walkley ward—which includes the districts of Netherthorpe, Upperthorpe, Walkley and parts of Neepsend—is one of the 28 electoral wards in City of Sheffield, England. It is located in the northwestern part of the city and covers an area of 3.8 km^{2}. The population of this ward in 2011 was 21,793 people in 9,654 households. The ward is in Sheffield Central Parliamentary Constituency.

== Districts of Walkley ward ==
=== Walkley ===
Walkley (grid reference SK336885) is a suburb in the north west of Sheffield in England. It lies north-east of Crookes and south of Hillsborough.

=== Netherthorpe ===
Netherthorpe (grid reference SK343875) is a council estate lying south-east of the Ponderosa open space. Originally an area of working-class Victorian terraces, it was reconstructed in the 1960s as an area of tower blocks and medium-rise flats with a few houses. In the late 1990s the tower blocks were reclad and many of the other flats demolished and replaced by modern housing.

=== Upperthorpe ===
Upperthorpe (grid reference SK342881) lies north-west of the Ponderosa open space and south east of Walkley. Building in the area began in the late Georgian period, from which the former infirmary (now offices) and a few houses survive. Construction continued, with many large Victorian houses and a car-free late-20th-century housing estate surviving. The Kelvin Flats were a landmark in the area, of similar design to now listed Park Hill, but were demolished in the early 1990s. The area is served by the Infirmary Road Sheffield Supertram stop.

== See also ==
- Sheffield City Council
- Sheffield City Council elections
