= 2004 Sheffield City Council election =

| ← 2003 | 10 June 2004 | 2006 → |

All 84 seats to Sheffield City Council 43 seats needed for a majority
| | First party | Second party |
|---|---|---|
| Party | Labour | Liberal Democrats |
| Seats won | 44 | 37 |
| Seat change | ▼5 | ▲1 |
| | Third party | Fourth party |
| Party | Conservative | Green |
| Seats won | 2 | 1 |
| Seat change | ▲1 | ▲1 |
- Map showing the results of the 2004 Sheffield City Council elections.
Majority party before election
Labour
Majority party after election
Labour

Elections to Sheffield City Council were held on 10 June 2004. The whole council was up for election with boundary changes having taken place since the last election in 2003, reducing the number of seats by 3. This election was the first all-postal vote election held, dramatically improving overall turnout by 14.4% on the previous election to 43.9%. The Labour Party kept its overall majority and continued to run the council, albeit on a much slimmer majority. Previous to the boundary changes, sitting Hillsborough councillor Peter MacLoughlin defected from the Liberal Democrats to an Independent, choosing not to contest this election.

== Election result ==
Sheffield local election result 2004
| Party | Seats | Gains | Losses | Net gain/loss | Seats % | Votes % | Votes | +/− |
|---|---|---|---|---|---|---|---|---|
| Labour | 44 | 0 | 0 | 0 | 52.4 | 34.4 | 59,412 | -6.8 |
| Liberal Democrats | 37 | 0 | 0 | 0 | 44.0 | 30.8 | 53,132 | -5.4 |
| Conservative | 2 | 0 | 0 | 0 | 2.4 | 15.8 | 27,226 | +1.4 |
| Green | 1 | 0 | 0 | 0 | 1.2 | 12.8 | 22,031 | +6.6 |
| BNP | 0 | 0 | 0 | 0 | 0.0 | 3.2 | 5,460 | +2.3 |
| UKIP | 0 | 0 | 0 | 0 | 0.0 | 1.5 | 2,512 | +1.1 |
| Independent | 0 | 0 | 0 | 0 | 0.0 | 0.6 | 1,116 | N/A |
| Independent Labour | 0 | 0 | 0 | 0 | 0.0 | 0.5 | 882 | +0.3 |
| Democratic Socialist Alliance | 0 | 0 | 0 | 0 | 0.0 | 0.4 | 610 | N/A |
| Socialist Alternative | 0 | 0 | 0 | 0 | 0.0 | 0.1 | 253 | ±0.0 |

This result has the following consequences for the total number of seats on the council after the elections:

| Party | Previous council | New council |
|---|---|---|
| Labour | 49 | 44 |
| Liberal Democrats | 36 | 37 |
| Conservatives | 1 | 2 |
| Green | 0 | 1 |
| Independent Liberal Democrat | 1 | 0 |
| Total | 87 | 84 |
| Working majority | 11 | 4 |

== Ward results ==
=== Arbourthorne ===
Julie Dore and John Robson were sitting councillors for Park, Timothy Rippon was a sitting councillor for Southey Green, Robert McCann was a sitting councillor for Intake, Christopher Tutt was a sitting councillor for Norton

Arbourthorne
| Party | Candidate | Votes | % | ±% |
|---|---|---|---|---|
| Labour | Julie Dore* | 2,336 | 51.6 | N/A |
| Labour | John Robson* | 2,326 | 51.4 | N/A |
| Labour | Timothy Rippon* | 2,231 | 49.3 | N/A |
| Liberal Democrats | Robert McCann* | 1,313 | 29.0 | N/A |
| Liberal Democrats | Frank Taylor | 1,186 | 26.2 | N/A |
| Liberal Democrats | Christopher Tutt* | 1,173 | 25.9 | N/A |
| Conservative | Simon Dawson | 563 | 12.4 | N/A |
| Conservative | David Cook | 513 | 11.3 | N/A |
| Conservative | Alexander Carroll | 503 | 11.1 | N/A |
| Green | Alexa Walker | 403 | 8.9 | N/A |
| Socialist Alternative | Terence Wykes | 253 | 5.6 | N/A |
| Majority | | 918 | 20.3 | N/A |
| Turnout | | 4,523 | 39.06 | N/A |
| Labour win (new seat) | | | | |
| Labour win (new seat) | | | | |
| Labour win (new seat) | | | | |

=== Beauchief & Greenhill ===
James Hanson was a sitting councillor for Owlerton

Beauchief & Greenhill
| Party | Candidate | Votes | % | ±% |
|---|---|---|---|---|
| Liberal Democrats | Anthony Holmes | 2,661 | 39.6 | N/A |
| Liberal Democrats | Simon Clement-Jones | 2,558 | 38.1 | N/A |
| Liberal Democrats | Clive Skelton | 2,271 | 33.8 | N/A |
| Labour | James Hanson* | 2,151 | 32.0 | N/A |
| Labour | Louise Webb | 1,947 | 29.0 | N/A |
| Labour | Raja Shaffique | 1,717 | 25.6 | N/A |
| BNP | John Beatson | 962 | 14.3 | N/A |
| Conservative | Peter Smith | 955 | 14.2 | N/A |
| Conservative | Kenneth Hadley | 922 | 13.7 | N/A |
| Conservative | Gordon Gregory | 836 | 12.4 | N/A |
| Green | Kethryn Aston | 559 | 8.3 | N/A |
| Majority | | 120 | 1.8 | N/A |
| Turnout | | 6,718 | 48.72 | N/A |
| Liberal Democrats win (new seat) | | | | |
| Liberal Democrats win (new seat) | | | | |
| Liberal Democrats win (new seat) | | | | |

=== Beighton ===
Christopher Rosling-Josephs was a sitting councillor for Mosborough

Beighton
| Party | Candidate | Votes | % | ±% |
|---|---|---|---|---|
| Labour | Ian Saunders | 2,501 | 49.4 | N/A |
| Labour | Christopher Rosling-Josephs* | 2,133 | 42.1 | N/A |
| Labour | Helen Mirfin-Boukouris | 1,966 | 38.8 | N/A |
| Conservative | Laurence Hayward | 1,141 | 22.5 | N/A |
| Conservative | Graham Wallis | 1,082 | 21.4 | N/A |
| Conservative | Claire Robinson | 1,045 | 20.6 | N/A |
| Liberal Democrats | Allan Wisbey | 673 | 13.3 | N/A |
| Liberal Democrats | Matthew Wisbey | 622 | 12.3 | N/A |
| Independent | Richard Ratcliffe | 570 | 11.2 | N/A |
| Green | Andrew Brandram | 517 | 10.2 | N/A |
| Liberal Democrats | Tasadique Mohammed | 422 | 8.3 | N/A |
| Majority | | 825 | 16.3 | N/A |
| Turnout | | 5,067 | 38.34 | N/A |
| Labour win (new seat) | | | | |
| Labour win (new seat) | | | | |
| Labour win (new seat) | | | | |

=== Birley ===
Bryan Lodge, Angela Smith and Michael Pye were sitting councillors for Birley

Birley
| Party | Candidate | Votes | % | ±% |
|---|---|---|---|---|
| Labour | Bryan Lodge* | 3,181 | 55.4 | N/A |
| Labour | Angela Smith* | 2,660 | 46.3 | N/A |
| Labour | Michael Pye* | 2,636 | 45.9 | N/A |
| Liberal Democrats | Philip Morris | 1,227 | 21.4 | N/A |
| Conservative | Freda Hutchinson | 990 | 17.2 | N/A |
| Conservative | Philip Cadman | 978 | 17.0 | N/A |
| Liberal Democrats | David Black | 865 | 15.1 | N/A |
| Liberal Democrats | Richard Towers | 834 | 14.5 | N/A |
| Conservative | Kathleen Campbell | 807 | 14.0 | N/A |
| Green | Julie White | 585 | 10.2 | N/A |
| Majority | | 1,409 | 24.5 | N/A |
| Turnout | | 5,746 | 46.13 | N/A |
| Labour win (new seat) | | | | |
| Labour win (new seat) | | | | |
| Labour win (new seat) | | | | |

=== Broomhill ===
Paul Scriven and Alan Whitehouse were sitting councillors for Broomhill

Broomhill
| Party | Candidate | Votes | % | ±% |
|---|---|---|---|---|
| Liberal Democrats | Paul Scriven* | 1,872 | 42.4 | N/A |
| Liberal Democrats | Alan Whitehouse* | 1,821 | 41.2 | N/A |
| Liberal Democrats | Shaffaq Mohammed | 1,554 | 35.2 | N/A |
| Green | Gillian Booth | 1,132 | 25.6 | N/A |
| Labour | Terry Cooper | 898 | 20.3 | N/A |
| Labour | Gerald Bates | 890 | 20.2 | N/A |
| Labour | Richard Eastall | 873 | 19.8 | N/A |
| Green | Robert Cole | 795 | 18.0 | N/A |
| Conservative | Veronica Hague | 655 | 14.8 | N/A |
| Green | Daniel Lyons | 648 | 14.7 | N/A |
| Conservative | Geoffrey Tryon | 566 | 12.8 | N/A |
| Conservative | Naguib Hajiani | 471 | 10.7 | N/A |
| Majority | | 422 | 9.6 | N/A |
| Turnout | | 4,416 | 35.68 | N/A |
| Liberal Democrats win (new seat) | | | | |
| Liberal Democrats win (new seat) | | | | |
| Liberal Democrats win (new seat) | | | | |

=== Burngreave ===
Jacqueline Drayton, Ibrar Hussain and Stephen Jones were sitting councillors for Burngreave

Burngreave
| Party | Candidate | Votes | % | ±% |
|---|---|---|---|---|
| Labour | Jacqueline Drayton* | 2,891 | 54.8 | N/A |
| Labour | Ibrar Hussain* | 2,887 | 54.7 | N/A |
| Labour | Stephen Jones* | 2,565 | 48.6 | N/A |
| Liberal Democrats | David Dawson | 904 | 17.1 | N/A |
| Green | Christopher Sissons | 893 | 16.9 | N/A |
| Liberal Democrats | Barbara Masters | 828 | 15.7 | N/A |
| Liberal Democrats | Roger Hughes | 815 | 15.4 | N/A |
| Democratic Socialist Alliance | Alison Brown | 610 | 11.6 | N/A |
| Conservative | Neil Everest | 577 | 10.9 | N/A |
| Conservative | Philip Kirby | 499 | 9.5 | N/A |
| Conservative | Marie Weston | 451 | 8.5 | N/A |
| Majority | | 1,661 | 31.5 | N/A |
| Turnout | | 5,277 | 37.12 | N/A |
| Labour win (new seat) | | | | |
| Labour win (new seat) | | | | |
| Labour win (new seat) | | | | |

=== Central ===
Jean Cromar and Mohammad Nazir were sitting councillors for Sharrow, Mohammed Khan was a sitting councillor for Firth Park

Central
| Party | Candidate | Votes | % | ±% |
|---|---|---|---|---|
| Labour | Jean Cromar* | 1,355 | 34.6 | N/A |
| Green | Jillian Creasy | 1,305 | 33.3 | N/A |
| Liberal Democrats | Mohammad Azim | 1,276 | 32.6 | N/A |
| Labour | Mohammad Nazir* | 1,065 | 27.2 | N/A |
| Green | Bernard Little | 1,058 | 27.0 | N/A |
| Labour | Mohammed Khan* | 1,055 | 26.9 | N/A |
| Green | Robert Murphy | 1,016 | 26.0 | N/A |
| Liberal Democrats | Haq Nawaz | 889 | 22.7 | N/A |
| Liberal Democrats | Muhammad Zahur | 590 | 15.1 | N/A |
| Conservative | Nick Bryan | 408 | 10.4 | N/A |
| Conservative | Patricia Barnsley | 380 | 9.7 | N/A |
| Conservative | Roger Barnsley | 379 | 9.7 | N/A |
| Majority | | 211 | 5.4 | N/A |
| Turnout | | 3,915 | 35.60 | N/A |
| Labour win (new seat) | | | | |
| Green win (new seat) | | | | |
| Liberal Democrats win (new seat) | | | | |

=== Crookes ===
Brian Holmes and Sylvia Anginotti were sitting councillors for Netherthorpe, Leonard Hesketh was a sitting councillor for Hallam

Crookes
| Party | Candidate | Votes | % | ±% |
|---|---|---|---|---|
| Liberal Democrats | Brian Holmes* | 3,197 | 48.4 | N/A |
| Liberal Democrats | Leonard Hesketh* | 3,042 | 46.2 | N/A |
| Liberal Democrats | Sylvia Anginotti* | 2,632 | 39.9 | N/A |
| Labour | Craig Berry | 1,569 | 23.8 | N/A |
| Green | Nicola Freeman | 1,431 | 21.7 | N/A |
| Conservative | Michael Young | 1,416 | 21.5 | N/A |
| Labour | Christopher Batchelor | 1,305 | 19.8 | N/A |
| Conservative | Kevin Mahoney | 1,271 | 19.3 | N/A |
| Conservative | Miles Waters | 1,267 | 19.2 | N/A |
| Labour | John Darwin | 1,118 | 17.0 | N/A |
| Majority | | 1,063 | 16.1 | N/A |
| Turnout | | 6,590 | 48.76 | N/A |
| Liberal Democrats win (new seat) | | | | |
| Liberal Democrats win (new seat) | | | | |
| Liberal Democrats win (new seat) | | | | |

=== Darnall ===
Mary Lea and Mohammed Altaf were sitting councillors for Darnall, Harry Harpham was a sitting councillor for Manor

Darnall
| Party | Candidate | Votes | % | ±% |
|---|---|---|---|---|
| Labour | Mary Lea* | 2,548 | 41.9 | N/A |
| Labour | Harry Harpham* | 2,261 | 37.1 | N/A |
| Labour | Mohammad Altaf* | 2,193 | 36.0 | N/A |
| Liberal Democrats | Muhammad Ali | 1,529 | 25.1 | N/A |
| Liberal Democrats | Mohammed Malik | 1,455 | 23.9 | N/A |
| Liberal Democrats | Richard Bowden | 1,423 | 23.4 | N/A |
| UKIP | Charlotte Arnott | 1,015 | 16.7 | N/A |
| Conservative | Dorothy Kennedy | 666 | 10.9 | N/A |
| Green | David Havard | 553 | 9.1 | N/A |
| Conservative | Anne Corke | 549 | 9.0 | N/A |
| Conservative | Katherine Pinder | 494 | 8.1 | N/A |
| Majority | | 664 | 10.9 | N/A |
| Turnout | | 6,088 | 43.09 | N/A |
| Labour win (new seat) | | | | |
| Labour win (new seat) | | | | |
| Labour win (new seat) | | | | |

=== Dore & Totley ===
Anne Smith, Keith Hill and Colin Ross were sitting councillors for Dore

Dore & Totley
| Party | Candidate | Votes | % | ±% |
|---|---|---|---|---|
| Conservative | Anne Smith* | 3,740 | 46.8 | N/A |
| Conservative | Michael Waters | 3,302 | 41.3 | N/A |
| Liberal Democrats | Keith Hill* | 3,293 | 41.2 | N/A |
| Liberal Democrats | Colin Ross* | 3,238 | 40.5 | N/A |
| Conservative | Michael Ginn | 3,140 | 39.3 | N/A |
| Liberal Democrats | John Day | 2,983 | 37.3 | N/A |
| Labour | David Crosby | 761 | 9.5 | N/A |
| Labour | Jennifer Henderson | 691 | 8.7 | N/A |
| Green | Dawn Biram | 653 | 8.2 | N/A |
| Labour | Donald Henderson | 652 | 8.2 | N/A |
| Majority | | 55 | 0.7 | N/A |
| Turnout | | 7,988 | 59.23 | N/A |
| Conservative win (new seat) | | | | |
| Conservative win (new seat) | | | | |
| Liberal Democrats win (new seat) | | | | |

=== East Ecclesfield ===
Patricia Fox and Graham Oxley were sitting councillors for Chapel Green, Victoria Bowden was a sitting councillor for South Wortley, Beverley Wright was a sitting councillor for Norton

East Ecclesfield
| Party | Candidate | Votes | % | ±% |
|---|---|---|---|---|
| Liberal Democrats | Patricia Fox* | 2,362 | 38.2 | N/A |
| Liberal Democrats | Victoria Bowden* | 2,345 | 37.9 | N/A |
| Liberal Democrats | Graham Oxley* | 2,339 | 37.8 | N/A |
| Labour | Adele Jagger | 2,078 | 33.6 | N/A |
| Labour | Jared O'Mara | 1,913 | 30.9 | N/A |
| Labour | Beverley Wright* | 1,801 | 29.1 | N/A |
| BNP | Ian Smith | 1,123 | 18.2 | N/A |
| Conservative | Brian Mole | 546 | 8.8 | N/A |
| Green | Lamia Safir | 539 | 8.7 | N/A |
| Conservative | Hedley Oldfield | 527 | 8.5 | N/A |
| Conservative | Emma Waters | 483 | 7.8 | N/A |
| Majority | | 261 | 4.2 | N/A |
| Turnout | | 6,187 | 44.85 | N/A |
| Liberal Democrats win (new seat) | | | | |
| Liberal Democrats win (new seat) | | | | |
| Liberal Democrats win (new seat) | | | | |

=== Ecclesall ===
Sylvia Dunkley, Ruth Dawson and Roger Davison were sitting councillors for Ecclesall

Ecclesall
| Party | Candidate | Votes | % | ±% |
|---|---|---|---|---|
| Liberal Democrats | Sylvia Dunkley* | 3,934 | 51.9 | N/A |
| Liberal Democrats | Ruth Dawson* | 3,891 | 51.3 | N/A |
| Liberal Democrats | Roger Davison* | 3,642 | 48.0 | N/A |
| Conservative | Sidney Cordle | 2,250 | 29.7 | N/A |
| Conservative | David Pinder | 2,173 | 28.6 | N/A |
| Conservative | Lisa O'Toole | 1,957 | 25.8 | N/A |
| Labour | Stephanie Thomas | 1,179 | 15.5 | N/A |
| Green | Ronald Giles | 1,163 | 15.3 | N/A |
| Labour | Mohammed Hussain | 923 | 12.2 | N/A |
| Labour | Philip Abbas | 873 | 11.5 | N/A |
| Majority | | 1,392 | 18.3 | N/A |
| Turnout | | 7,585 | 53.55 | N/A |
| Liberal Democrats win (new seat) | | | | |
| Liberal Democrats win (new seat) | | | | |
| Liberal Democrats win (new seat) | | | | |

=== Firth Park ===
Joan Barton and Alan Law were sitting councillors for Firth Park, Christopher Weldon was a sitting councillor for Owlerton

Firth Park
| Party | Candidate | Votes | % | ±% |
|---|---|---|---|---|
| Labour | Joan Barton* | 2,629 | 58.1 | N/A |
| Labour | Christopher Weldon* | 2,361 | 52.2 | N/A |
| Labour | Alan Law* | 2,154 | 47.6 | N/A |
| Conservative | Russell Cutts | 710 | 15.7 | N/A |
| Green | Steven Marshall | 677 | 15.0 | N/A |
| Conservative | Paul Rymill | 635 | 14.0 | N/A |
| Conservative | Marjorie Kirby | 574 | 12.7 | N/A |
| Liberal Democrats | Angela Hill | 569 | 12.6 | N/A |
| Liberal Democrats | Helen Blaby | 564 | 12.5 | N/A |
| Liberal Democrats | Michael Reynolds | 559 | 12.4 | N/A |
| Majority | | 1,444 | 31.9 | N/A |
| Turnout | | 4,525 | 35.49 | N/A |
| Labour win (new seat) | | | | |
| Labour win (new seat) | | | | |
| Labour win (new seat) | | | | |

=== Fulwood ===
John Knight was a sitting councillor for Hallam, Andrew Sangar was a sitting councillor for Beauchief, Janice Sidebottom was a sitting councillor for Broomhill

Fulwood
| Party | Candidate | Votes | % | ±% |
|---|---|---|---|---|
| Liberal Democrats | John Knight* | 3,161 | 48.6 | N/A |
| Liberal Democrats | Andrew Sangar* | 2,998 | 46.1 | N/A |
| Liberal Democrats | Janice Sidebottom* | 2,898 | 44.6 | N/A |
| Conservative | Christopher Ashford | 1,928 | 29.7 | N/A |
| Conservative | Alan Ryder | 1,915 | 29.5 | N/A |
| Conservative | Samuel Oakley | 1,887 | 29.0 | N/A |
| Labour | Dennis Brown | 889 | 13.7 | N/A |
| Green | Laura Anderson | 877 | 13.5 | N/A |
| Labour | Mark Gamsu | 788 | 12.1 | N/A |
| Labour | Maxwell Telfer | 653 | 10.0 | N/A |
| UKIP | Nigel James | 420 | 6.5 | N/A |
| Majority | | 970 | 14.9 | N/A |
| Turnout | | 6,502 | 50.94 | N/A |
| Liberal Democrats win (new seat) | | | | |
| Liberal Democrats win (new seat) | | | | |
| Liberal Democrats win (new seat) | | | | |

=== Gleadless Valley ===
Terence Fox was a sitting councillor for Heeley, Garry Weatherall was a sitting councillor for Norton

Gleadless Valley
| Party | Candidate | Votes | % | ±% |
|---|---|---|---|---|
| Labour | Terence Fox* | 2,402 | 39.4 | N/A |
| Labour | Rosemary Telfer | 2,381 | 39.1 | N/A |
| Labour | Garry Weatherall* | 2,184 | 35.8 | N/A |
| Liberal Democrats | Derek Glossop | 1,749 | 28.7 | N/A |
| Liberal Democrats | Denise Reaney | 1,530 | 25.1 | N/A |
| Liberal Democrats | John Bowden | 1,473 | 24.1 | N/A |
| Green | Robert Unwin | 1,262 | 20.7 | N/A |
| Green | Philip Grantham | 1,097 | 18.0 | N/A |
| Green | Heather Hunt | 1,096 | 18.0 | N/A |
| Conservative | John Berry | 651 | 10.7 | N/A |
| Conservative | Francis Woodger | 622 | 10.2 | N/A |
| Conservative | Matthew Johnson | 606 | 9.9 | N/A |
| Majority | | 435 | 7.1 | N/A |
| Turnout | | 6,102 | 44.53 | N/A |
| Labour win (new seat) | | | | |
| Labour win (new seat) | | | | |
| Labour win (new seat) | | | | |

=== Graves Park ===
Peter Moore was a sitting councillor for Beauchief

Graves Park
| Party | Candidate | Votes | % | ±% |
|---|---|---|---|---|
| Liberal Democrats | Peter Moore* | 2,826 | 44.2 | N/A |
| Liberal Democrats | Ian Auckland | 2,742 | 42.9 | N/A |
| Liberal Democrats | Barrie Jervis | 2,393 | 37.4 | N/A |
| Labour | Robert Pemberton | 1,799 | 28.1 | N/A |
| Labour | Sandra Freeman | 1,752 | 27.4 | N/A |
| Labour | Oliver Coppard | 1,628 | 25.5 | N/A |
| Conservative | Alan Dunkerley | 1,089 | 17.0 | N/A |
| Conservative | Michelle Grant | 1,083 | 16.9 | N/A |
| Conservative | Trevor Grant | 1,034 | 16.2 | N/A |
| Green | Rita Wilcock | 890 | 13.9 | N/A |
| Majority | | 594 | 9.3 | N/A |
| Turnout | | 6,396 | 48.53 | N/A |
| Liberal Democrats win (new seat) | | | | |
| Liberal Democrats win (new seat) | | | | |
| Liberal Democrats win (new seat) | | | | |

=== Hillsborough ===
Robert MacDonald and Janet Bragg were sitting councillors for Hillsborough, Alfred Meade was a sitting councillor for Brightside

Hillsborough
| Party | Candidate | Votes | % | ±% |
|---|---|---|---|---|
| Labour | Robert MacDonald* | 2,576 | 42.9 | N/A |
| Labour | Alfred Meade* | 2,557 | 42.6 | N/A |
| Labour | Janet Bragg* | 2,475 | 41.2 | N/A |
| Liberal Democrats | Melanie Sidebottom | 2,094 | 34.9 | N/A |
| Liberal Democrats | Penelope Baker | 1,976 | 32.9 | N/A |
| Liberal Democrats | Christine Tosseano | 1,779 | 29.6 | N/A |
| Green | Christopher McMahon | 881 | 14.7 | N/A |
| Conservative | Helen Smith | 561 | 9.3 | N/A |
| Conservative | Valerie Butcher | 555 | 9.2 | N/A |
| Conservative | Peter Smith | 522 | 8.7 | N/A |
| Majority | | 381 | 6.3 | N/A |
| Turnout | | 6,006 | 48.86 | N/A |
| Labour win (new seat) | | | | |
| Labour win (new seat) | | | | |
| Labour win (new seat) | | | | |

=== Manor Castle ===
Patricia Midgley and Janet Wilson were sitting councillors for Castle, Janet Fiore was a sitting councillor for Manor

Manor Castle
| Party | Candidate | Votes | % | ±% |
|---|---|---|---|---|
| Labour | Patricia Midgley* | 2,516 | 61.5 | N/A |
| Labour | Janet Fiore* | 2,205 | 53.9 | N/A |
| Labour | Janet Wilson* | 2,094 | 51.2 | N/A |
| Liberal Democrats | Michael Coleman | 599 | 14.6 | N/A |
| Green | Graham Wroe | 573 | 14.0 | N/A |
| Green | Elizabeth Cooper | 567 | 13.9 | N/A |
| Green | Timothy Cooper | 497 | 12.2 | N/A |
| Liberal Democrats | Rosemary Dando | 486 | 11.9 | N/A |
| Liberal Democrats | Angela Culley | 461 | 11.3 | N/A |
| Conservative | Andrew Watson | 366 | 8.9 | N/A |
| Conservative | Harry Hall | 365 | 8.9 | N/A |
| Conservative | Daniel Riddington-Young | 335 | 8.2 | N/A |
| Majority | | 1,495 | 36.6 | N/A |
| Turnout | | 4,090 | 34.96 | N/A |
| Labour win (new seat) | | | | |
| Labour win (new seat) | | | | |
| Labour win (new seat) | | | | |

=== Mosborough ===
Samuel Wall was a sitting councillor for Mosborough

Mosborough
| Party | Candidate | Votes | % | ±% |
|---|---|---|---|---|
| Labour | Andrew Peat | 2,350 | 42.3 | N/A |
| Labour | David Barker | 2,038 | 36.6 | N/A |
| Labour | Samuel Wall* | 1,977 | 35.5 | N/A |
| Liberal Democrats | Gail Smith | 1,531 | 27.5 | N/A |
| Conservative | Shirley Clayton | 1,204 | 21.6 | N/A |
| Liberal Democrats | Judith Webster | 1,193 | 21.4 | N/A |
| Conservative | Evelyn Millward | 1,156 | 20.8 | N/A |
| Conservative | Gordon Millward | 1,129 | 20.3 | N/A |
| Liberal Democrats | Terry McElligott | 1,077 | 19.4 | N/A |
| Green | Julian Briggs | 451 | 8.1 | N/A |
| Majority | | 446 | 8.0 | N/A |
| Turnout | | 5,555 | 41.65 | N/A |
| Labour win (new seat) | | | | |
| Labour win (new seat) | | | | |
| Labour win (new seat) | | | | |

=== Nether Edge ===
Ali Qadar, Andrew White and Patricia White were sitting councillors for Nether Edge

Nether Edge
| Party | Candidate | Votes | % | ±% |
|---|---|---|---|---|
| Liberal Democrats | Ali Qadar* | 2,818 | 42.3 | N/A |
| Liberal Democrats | Andrew White* | 2,443 | 36.6 | N/A |
| Liberal Democrats | Patricia White* | 2,408 | 36.1 | N/A |
| Labour | Mohammad Maroof | 1,830 | 27.5 | N/A |
| Labour | Matthew Peck | 1,568 | 23.5 | N/A |
| Labour | Farhat Javed | 1,502 | 22.5 | N/A |
| Green | Mervyn Smith | 1,178 | 17.7 | N/A |
| Green | Gemma Lock | 1,031 | 15.5 | N/A |
| Green | Linda Duckenfield | 988 | 14.8 | N/A |
| Conservative | Ian Ramsay | 906 | 13.6 | N/A |
| Conservative | Susan Hayward | 804 | 12.1 | N/A |
| Conservative | Rosita Malandrinos | 778 | 11.7 | N/A |
| Majority | | 578 | 8.6 | N/A |
| Turnout | | 6,666 | 50.53 | N/A |
| Liberal Democrats win (new seat) | | | | |
| Liberal Democrats win (new seat) | | | | |
| Liberal Democrats win (new seat) | | | | |

=== Richmond ===
Martin Lawton and John Campbell were sitting councillors for Intake, Terry Barrow was a sitting councillor for Darnall

Richmond
| Party | Candidate | Votes | % | ±% |
|---|---|---|---|---|
| Labour | Martin Lawton* | 2,517 | 46.6 | N/A |
| Labour | John Campbell* | 2,383 | 44.1 | N/A |
| Labour | Terry Barrow* | 2,334 | 43.2 | N/A |
| Independent Labour | Elsie Smith | 882 | 16.3 | N/A |
| Liberal Democrats | Christopher Ingold | 848 | 15.7 | N/A |
| Liberal Democrats | Joanne Ingold | 837 | 15.5 | N/A |
| Liberal Democrats | Sarah Smalley | 808 | 14.9 | N/A |
| Green | Eamonn Ward | 749 | 13.9 | N/A |
| Conservative | Judith Burkinshaw | 660 | 12.2 | N/A |
| Conservative | Nicholas Morris | 631 | 11.7 | N/A |
| Conservative | Ian Fey | 618 | 11.4 | N/A |
| Independent | Maureen Potts | 546 | 10.1 | N/A |
| Majority | | 1,452 | 26.9 | N/A |
| Turnout | | 5,405 | 41.58 | N/A |
| Labour win (new seat) | | | | |
| Labour win (new seat) | | | | |
| Labour win (new seat) | | | | |

=== Shiregreen & Brightside ===
Jane Bird and Peter Rippon were sitting councillors for Nether Shire, Peter Price was a sitting councillor for Brightside, Michael Davis was a sitting councillor for Beauchief

Shiregreen & Brightside
| Party | Candidate | Votes | % | ±% |
|---|---|---|---|---|
| Labour | Jane Bird* | 2,596 | 56.7 | N/A |
| Labour | Peter Price* | 2,482 | 54.2 | N/A |
| Labour | Peter Rippon* | 2,250 | 49.1 | N/A |
| BNP | Christopher Hartigan | 1,296 | 28.3 | N/A |
| Liberal Democrats | John Tomlinson | 721 | 15.7 | N/A |
| Liberal Democrats | Michael Davis* | 592 | 12.9 | N/A |
| Liberal Democrats | Sheila Hughes | 584 | 12.7 | N/A |
| Conservative | Patrick Maloney | 490 | 10.7 | N/A |
| Conservative | Eric Kirby | 463 | 10.1 | N/A |
| Green | Bridget Evans | 449 | 9.8 | N/A |
| Conservative | Mohammed Tariq | 349 | 7.6 | N/A |
| Majority | | 954 | 20.8 | N/A |
| Turnout | | 4,581 | 33.41 | N/A |
| Labour win (new seat) | | | | |
| Labour win (new seat) | | | | |
| Labour win (new seat) | | | | |

=== Southey ===
Anthony Damms was a sitting councillor for Southey Green, Gillian Furniss was a sitting councillor for Manor

Southey
| Party | Candidate | Votes | % | ±% |
|---|---|---|---|---|
| Labour | Anthony Damms* | 2,591 | 53.9 | N/A |
| Labour | Leigh Bramall | 2,434 | 50.6 | N/A |
| Labour | Gillian Furniss* | 2,192 | 45.6 | N/A |
| BNP | Roy James | 1,132 | 23.5 | N/A |
| Liberal Democrats | James Tosseano | 625 | 13.0 | N/A |
| Liberal Democrats | Andrew Cooke | 553 | 11.5 | N/A |
| Liberal Democrats | Roger Mercer | 515 | 10.7 | N/A |
| Conservative | Matthew Dixon | 423 | 8.8 | N/A |
| Conservative | Peter Buckle | 398 | 8.3 | N/A |
| Green | Christine Gilligan Kubo | 386 | 8.0 | N/A |
| Conservative | Sandra Buckle | 380 | 7.9 | N/A |
| Majority | | 1,060 | 22.1 | N/A |
| Turnout | | 4,807 | 36.40 | N/A |
| Labour win (new seat) | | | | |
| Labour win (new seat) | | | | |
| Labour win (new seat) | | | | |

=== Stannington ===
Arthur Dunworth and David Baker were sitting councillors for South Wortley, John Webster was a sitting councillor for Brightside, Steven Wilson was a sitting councillor for Southey Green

Stannington
| Party | Candidate | Votes | % | ±% |
|---|---|---|---|---|
| Liberal Democrats | Arthur Dunworth* | 2,700 | 41.1 | N/A |
| Liberal Democrats | Vickie Priestley | 2,578 | 39.3 | N/A |
| Liberal Democrats | David Baker* | 2,341 | 35.7 | N/A |
| Labour | Graham Fawley | 1,977 | 30.1 | N/A |
| Labour | John Webster* | 1,595 | 24.3 | N/A |
| Labour | Steven Wilson* | 1,556 | 23.7 | N/A |
| Conservative | Andrew Gabbitas | 1,368 | 20.8 | N/A |
| Conservative | Timothy Moffatt | 1,308 | 19.9 | N/A |
| Conservative | Leslie Firth | 1,138 | 17.3 | N/A |
| Green | Michael Maas | 894 | 13.6 | N/A |
| Majority | | 364 | 5.6 | N/A |
| Turnout | | 6,563 | 48.34 | N/A |
| Liberal Democrats win (new seat) | | | | |
| Liberal Democrats win (new seat) | | | | |
| Liberal Democrats win (new seat) | | | | |

=== Stocksbridge & Upper Don ===
Martin Davis and Martin Brelsford were sitting councillors for Stocksbridge

Stocksbridge & Upper Don
| Party | Candidate | Votes | % | ±% |
|---|---|---|---|---|
| Liberal Democrats | Martin Davis* | 2,881 | 47.8 | N/A |
| Liberal Democrats | Martin Brelsford* | 2,774 | 46.0 | N/A |
| Liberal Democrats | Alison Brelsford | 2,708 | 44.9 | N/A |
| Labour | Christopher Prescott | 1,673 | 27.7 | N/A |
| Labour | Sandra White | 1,668 | 27.7 | N/A |
| Labour | Douglas Patterson | 1,665 | 27.6 | N/A |
| Conservative | Tim Lewis | 1,005 | 16.7 | N/A |
| Green | Angela Roberts | 915 | 15.2 | N/A |
| Conservative | Philip Allen | 789 | 13.1 | N/A |
| Conservative | Robert Usher | 751 | 12.5 | N/A |
| Majority | | 1,035 | 17.2 | N/A |
| Turnout | | 6,032 | 41.85 | N/A |
| Liberal Democrats win (new seat) | | | | |
| Liberal Democrats win (new seat) | | | | |
| Liberal Democrats win (new seat) | | | | |

=== Walkley ===
Diane Leek, Veronica Hardstaff and Jonathan Harston were sitting councillors for Walkley, Stephen Ayris was a sitting councillor for Netherthorpe

Walkley
| Party | Candidate | Votes | % | ±% |
|---|---|---|---|---|
| Liberal Democrats | Diane Leek* | 2,343 | 40.9 | N/A |
| Labour | Veronica Hardstaff* | 2,271 | 39.7 | N/A |
| Liberal Democrats | Jonathan Harston* | 1,913 | 33.4 | N/A |
| Labour | James Bamford | 1,829 | 32.0 | N/A |
| Labour | Abdul Khayum | 1,581 | 27.6 | N/A |
| Liberal Democrats | Stephen Ayris* | 1,426 | 24.9 | N/A |
| Green | Barry New | 1,091 | 19.1 | N/A |
| Conservative | Christopher Fox | 513 | 9.0 | N/A |
| Conservative | John Neill | 461 | 8.1 | N/A |
| Conservative | Maureen Neill | 439 | 7.7 | N/A |
| Majority | | 84 | 1.4 | N/A |
| Turnout | | 5,722 | 43.11 | N/A |
| Liberal Democrats win (new seat) | | | | |
| Labour win (new seat) | | | | |
| Liberal Democrats win (new seat) | | | | |

=== West Ecclesfield ===
Kathleen Chadwick was a sitting councillor for Chapel Green

West Ecclesfield
| Party | Candidate | Votes | % | ±% |
|---|---|---|---|---|
| Liberal Democrats | Kathleen Chadwick* | 2,792 | 44.0 | N/A |
| Liberal Democrats | Alan Hooper | 2,485 | 39.1 | N/A |
| Liberal Democrats | Trevor Bagshaw | 2,243 | 35.3 | N/A |
| Labour | Sheila Tyler | 2,234 | 35.2 | N/A |
| Labour | Joyce Wright | 2,181 | 34.4 | N/A |
| Labour | Paul Jagger | 2,007 | 31.6 | N/A |
| Conservative | Paula Axelby | 860 | 13.5 | N/A |
| Conservative | Michael Pinder | 648 | 10.2 | N/A |
| Conservative | Michael Stringer | 606 | 9.5 | N/A |
| Green | Paul McMahon | 582 | 9.2 | N/A |
| Majority | | 9 | 0.1 | N/A |
| Turnout | | 6,349 | 43.45 | N/A |
| Liberal Democrats win (new seat) | | | | |
| Liberal Democrats win (new seat) | | | | |
| Liberal Democrats win (new seat) | | | | |

=== Woodhouse ===
Marjorie Barker, Michael Rooney and Raymond Satur were sitting councillors for Handsworth

Woodhouse
| Party | Candidate | Votes | % | ±% |
|---|---|---|---|---|
| Labour | Marjorie Barker* | 3,114 | 51.6 | N/A |
| Labour | Michael Rooney* | 2,963 | 49.1 | N/A |
| Labour | Raymond Satur* | 2,585 | 42.9 | N/A |
| UKIP | Jonathan Arnott | 1,077 | 17.9 | N/A |
| BNP | Derek Hutchinson | 947 | 15.7 | N/A |
| Liberal Democrats | Richard Forrester | 634 | 10.5 | N/A |
| Conservative | George Ledbury | 585 | 9.7 | N/A |
| Liberal Democrats | Robert Moffett | 584 | 9.7 | N/A |
| Liberal Democrats | Valerie Moffett | 578 | 9.6 | N/A |
| Conservative | Margaret Pigott | 559 | 9.3 | N/A |
| Conservative | June Ledbury | 541 | 9.0 | N/A |
| Green | Judith Rutnam | 443 | 7.3 | N/A |
| Majority | | 1,508 | 25.0 | N/A |
| Turnout | | 6,031 | 45.14 | N/A |
| Labour win (new seat) | | | | |
| Labour win (new seat) | | | | |
| Labour win (new seat) | | | | |

== By-elections between 2004 and 2006 ==
Birley By-Election 5 May 2005
| Party | Candidate | Votes | % | ±% |
|---|---|---|---|---|
| Labour | Denise Fox | 4,325 | 56.3 | +10.0 |
| Liberal Democrats | Robert McCann | 2,104 | 27.4 | +6.0 |
| Conservative | Gordon Millward | 710 | 9.2 | −8.0 |
| UKIP | Sally Stracey | 352 | 4.6 | N/A |
| Green | Eamonn Ward | 190 | 2.5 | −7.7 |
| Majority | | 2,221 | 28.9 | +4.4 |
| Turnout | | 7,681 | 61.4 | +15.3 |
| Labour hold | | Swing | | |
