= Toulson =

Toulson is an English-language patronymic surname that is a variant of the surnames Tolson and Tomlinson. Notable people with the surname include:

- Lois Toulson (born 1999), British diver
- Robert Tounson or Toulson (1575–1621), British dean and bishop
- Roger Toulson, Lord Toulson (1946–2017), British lawyer and judge
- Shirley Toulson (1924–2018), British writer
- Simon Toulson-Clarke (born 1961), British singer, member of Red Box

== See also ==
- Maude R. Toulson Federal Building, federal building in Maryland, United States
- Stephen Toulson & Sons, defunct Sheffield haulage company
