= Toolson =

Toolson is a surname. Notable people with the surname include:

- Andy Toolson (born 1966), American basketball player
- Ryan Toolson (born 1985), American basketball player, cousin of Andy
- Tanner Toolson (born 2002), American basketball player, son of Andy

== See also ==
- Tolson
- Toolson v. New York Yankees, Inc., a United States Supreme Court case
