= Jan Wilson =

Jan Wilson may refer to:

- Jan Wilson (British politician)
- Jan Wilson (Australian politician)
