= 2008 Sheffield City Council election =

← 2007	1 May 2008	2010 →

30 of 84 seats to Sheffield City Council 43 seats needed for a majority
	First party	Second party
Party	Liberal Democrats	Labour
Seats won	17	12
Seat change	▲6	▼5
	Third party	Fourth party
Party	Green	Conservative
Seats won	1	0
Seat change	▲1	▼1
- Map showing the results of the 2008 Sheffield City Council elections.
Majority party before election
No Overall Control
Majority party after election
Liberal Democrats

Sheffield City Council elections took place on Thursday 1 May 2008. There were 30 seats up for election - one of the three councillors from each ward, plus two seats from Labour councillors who had stepped down. Liberal Democrats made several gains, regaining control of the council for the first time since losing it in 2002. The overall turnout for this election was 36.8%.

== Councillors before and after the election ==
Ward	Incumbent Elected	Incumbent	Elected
Arbourthorne	2004	Julie Dore	Julie Dore
Beauchief & Greenhill	2004	Anthony Holmes	Louise McCann
Beighton	2004	Ian Saunders	Ian Saunders
Birley	2004	Bryan Lodge	Bryan Lodge
Broomhill	2004	Paul Scriven	Paul Scriven
Burngreave	2004	Jackie Drayton	Jackie Drayton
Central	2004	Jean Cromar	Robert Murphy
Crookes	2004	Brian Holmes	Brian Holmes
Darnall	2004	Mary Lea	Mary Lea
Dore and Totley	2004	Anne Smith	Colin Ross
East Ecclesfield	2004	Patricia Fox	Patricia Fox
Ecclesall	2004	Sylvia Dunkley	Sylvia Dunkley
Firth Park	2004	Joan Barton	Joan Barton
Fulwood	2004	John Knight	John Knight
Gleadless Valley	2004	Terry Fox	Frank Taylor
Graves Park	2004	Peter Moore	Peter Moore
Hillsborough	2004	Robert MacDonald	Joe Taylor
Manor Castle	2004	Pat Midgley	Pat Midgley
Mosborough (1)	2004	Mike Peat	Gail Smith
Mosborough (2)	2006	Sam Wall	Chris Tutt
Nether Edge	2004	Ali Qadar	Ali Qadar
Richmond (1)	2004	Martin Lawton	Martin Lawton
Richmond (2)	2006	Liz Naylor	Lynn Rooney
Shiregreen and Brightside	2004	Jane Bird	Jane Bird
Southey	2004	Tony Damms	Tony Damms
Stannington	2004	Arthur Dunworth	Arthur Dunworth
Stocksbridge and Upper Don	2004	Martin Davis	Jack Clarkson
Walkley	2004	Diane Leek	Diane Leek
West Ecclesfield	2004	Kathleen Chadwick	Kathleen Chadwick
Woodhouse	2004	Marjorie Barker	Marjorie Barker

== Election result ==
Sheffield City Council Election Result 2008
Party	Seats	Gains	Losses	Net gain/loss	Seats %	Votes %	Votes	+/−
Liberal Democrats	17	5	0	+5	56.7	36.9	50,282	+3.0
Labour	12	0	5	-5	40.0	30.0	40,939	-4.8
Conservative	0	0	1	-1	0.0	16.0	21,857	+1.5
Green	1	1	0	+1	3.3	9.1	12,446	-0.5
BNP	0	0	0	0	0.0	4.0	5,489	+0.7
UKIP	0	0	0	0	0.0	1.6	2,114	-0.2
Independent	0	0	0	0	0.0	1.3	1,799	N/A
Left List	0	0	0	0	0.0	0.8	1,089	N/A
Socialist Alternative	0	0	0	0	0.0	0.2	271	+0.1

The Liberal Democrats gained five seats from their position following the 2004 election, but also regained a seat lost to an Independent via defection in Stocksbridge & Upper Don.

Party	Previous council	New council
Liberal Democrats	39	45
Labour	41	36
Green	2	3
Conservatives	1	0
Independent Liberal Democrat	1	0
Total	84	84
Working majority	0	6

== Ward results ==
=== Arbourthorne ===
Arbourthorne
Party	Candidate	Votes	%	±%
Labour	Julie Dore*	1,606	41.5	−14.3
Liberal Democrats	Robert Cowbury	1,094	28.3	+6.2
Conservative	Peter Smith	727	18.8	+4.8
Green	Jennyfer Barnard	445	11.5	+3.4
Majority		512	13.2	−20.6
Turnout		3,872	32.0	+2.4
Labour hold		Swing		

=== Beauchief & Greenhill ===
Beauchief & Greenhill
Party	Candidate	Votes	%	±%
Liberal Democrats	Louise McCann	2,096	39.6	+1.3
Labour	Neil Cleeveley	1,451	27.4	−4.2
Conservative	Michelle Grant	941	17.8	+2.8
BNP	John Beatson	525	9.9	+0.5
Green	David Hayes	275	5.2	−0.4
Majority		645	12.2	+5.5
Turnout		5,288	39.0	−0.5
Liberal Democrats hold		Swing		

=== Beighton ===
Beighton
Party	Candidate	Votes	%	±%
Labour	Ian Saunders*	1,730	42.9	−5.6
Conservative	Shirley Clayton	1,234	30.6	+5.0
Liberal Democrats	Tracey Williams	746	18.5	+1.8
Green	Andrew Brandram	318	7.9	−1.3
Majority		496	12.3	−10.6
Turnout		4,028	31.0	−0.5
Labour hold		Swing		

=== Birley ===
Birley
Party	Candidate	Votes	%	±%
Labour	Bryan Lodge*	2,095	48.1	−5.5
Liberal Democrats	Ben Curran	952	21.8	+5.5
Conservative	Gordon Millward	872	20.0	+4.8
Green	Francis Plunkett	438	10.1	+1.6
Majority		1,143	26.2	−11.1
Turnout		4,357	34.4	+0.1
Labour hold		Swing		

=== Broomhill ===
Broomhill
Party	Candidate	Votes	%	±%
Liberal Democrats	Paul Scriven*	1,329	46.7	+1.3
Green	Rob Cole	756	26.6	−0.6
Labour	Zoe Sykes	401	14.1	−2.7
Conservative	Michael Ginn	359	12.6	+2.0
Majority		573	20.1	+1.9
Turnout		2,845	24.5	−1.6
Liberal Democrats hold		Swing		

=== Burngreave ===
Burngreave
Party	Candidate	Votes	%	±%
Labour	Jackie Drayton*	2,369	50.5	−1.1
Left List	Maxine Bowler	1,089	23.2	−0.8
Green	Christopher Sissons	638	13.6	+5.4
Conservative	Rashid Zaman	593	12.6	+3.0
Majority		1,280	27.3	−0.3
Turnout		5,689	32.0	−4.7
Labour hold		Swing		

=== Central ===
Central
Party	Candidate	Votes	%	±%
Green	Rob Murphy	1,611	40.2	+4.6
Labour	Mohammad Maroof	1,563	39.0	+8.0
Liberal Democrats	Mohammad Azim	522	13.0	−9.8
Conservative	June Ledbury	311	7.8	+1.0
Majority		48	1.2	−3.4
Turnout		4,007	31.0	±0.0
Green gain from Labour		Swing		

=== Crookes ===
Crookes
Party	Candidate	Votes	%	±%
Liberal Democrats	Brian Holmes*	2,690	52.9	−0.9
Conservative	Robert Sheridan	1,045	20.6	+3.3
Green	Julian Briggs	698	13.7	+1.3
Labour	Qurban Hussain	651	12.8	−3.7
Majority		1,645	32.4	−4.2
Turnout		5,084	38.0	−1.0
Liberal Democrats hold		Swing		

=== Darnall ===
Darnall
Party	Candidate	Votes	%	±%
Labour	Mary Lea*	2,039	44.3	−0.9
Liberal Democrats	Misbah Chowdhury	1,484	32.2	+21.0
Conservative	Anne Corke	439	9.5	+0.9
UKIP	Charlotte Arnott	414	9.0	+1.2
Green	Julie White	228	5.0	−0.4
Majority		555	12.1	−11.3
Turnout		4,604	34.0	−0.2
Labour hold		Swing		

=== Dore & Totley ===
Dore & Totley
Party	Candidate	Votes	%	±%
Liberal Democrats	Colin Ross	3,606	48.6	−3.6
Conservative	Anne Smith*	3,231	43.6	+8.1
Labour	Javed Khan	275	3.7	−2.3
Green	Rita Wilcock	183	2.5	−1.5
UKIP	James Laurie	124	1.7	−0.8
Majority		375	5.1	−11.6
Turnout		7,419	56.1	+3.0
Liberal Democrats gain from Conservative		Swing		

=== East Ecclesfield ===
East Ecclesfield
Party	Candidate	Votes	%	±%
Liberal Democrats	Patricia Fox*	2,314	43.0	+5.9
Labour	Angela Weatherall	1,622	30.2	−5.2
BNP	Shirley Collins	677	12.6	−0.5
Conservative	Paula Mayfield	582	10.8	+1.6
Green	Lamia Safir	181	3.4	−1.7
Majority		692	12.9	+11.1
Turnout		5,376	38.4	+8.5
Liberal Democrats hold		Swing		

=== Ecclesall ===
Ecclesall
Party	Candidate	Votes	%	±%
Liberal Democrats	Sylvia Dunkley*	3,893	58.2	+4.7
Conservative	Michael Young	1,630	24.4	−1.2
Green	Jason Leman	615	9.2	−1.8
Labour	Jack Scott	547	8.1	−1.8
Majority		2,263	33.9	+6.0
Turnout		6,685	47.0	+1.5
Liberal Democrats hold		Swing		

=== Firth Park ===
Firth Park
Party	Candidate	Votes	%	±%
Labour	Joan Barton*	1,813	47.5	−6.0
BNP	Michael Smith	742	19.5	+2.4
Liberal Democrats	Philip Morris	547	14.3	+2.4
Conservative	Paul Rymill	377	9.9	−0.4
Green	Jonathan Cook	257	6.7	−0.6
Independent	Maria-Barbara Noack	78	2.0	N/A
Majority		971	25.5	−10.9
Turnout		3,814	30.0	±0.0
Labour hold		Swing		

=== Fulwood ===
Fulwood
Party	Candidate	Votes	%	±%
Liberal Democrats	John Knight*	2,893	54.9	−1.2
Conservative	Alan Ryder	1,434	27.2	−0.3
Labour	Isobel Bowler	432	8.2	+0.9
Green	Stephen Hitchens	374	7.1	−0.1
UKIP	Patricia Sullivan	139	2.6	+0.7
Majority		1,459	27.7	−0.9
Turnout		5,272	44.0	−2.2
Liberal Democrats hold		Swing		

=== Gleadless Valley ===
Gleadless Valley
Party	Candidate	Votes	%	±%
Liberal Democrats	Frank Taylor	2,183	42.1	+3.1
Labour	Terence Fox*	1,821	35.1	−3.0
Green	Gareth Roberts	781	15.1	−0.7
Conservative	Jennifer Grant	400	7.7	+0.7
Majority		362	7.0	+6.1
Turnout		5,185	39.0	−0.8
Liberal Democrats gain from Labour		Swing		

=== Graves Park ===
Graves Park
Party	Candidate	Votes	%	±%
Liberal Democrats	Peter Moore*	2,519	47.1	+3.4
Labour	Robert Pemberton	1,105	20.7	−5.4
Conservative	Trevor Grant	885	16.5	+1.7
Green	Richard Roper	345	6.5	−1.5
Socialist Alternative	Alan Munro	271	5.1	+1.4
UKIP	Pauline Arnott	226	4.2	+0.4
Majority		1,417	26.5	+8.9
Turnout		5,348	41.0	+0.8
Liberal Democrats hold		Swing		

=== Hillsborough ===
Hillsborough
Party	Candidate	Votes	%	±%
Liberal Democrats	Joe Taylor	2,739	49.9	+5.5
Labour	Robert Macdonald*	1,620	29.5	−5.9
BNP	Eric Collins	491	8.9	+0.2
Green	Christopher McMahon	346	6.3	−0.2
Conservative	Neil Everest	292	5.3	+0.3
Majority		1,119	20.4	+11.4
Turnout		5,488	41.8	+0.6
Liberal Democrats gain from Labour		Swing		

=== Manor Castle ===
Manor Castle
Party	Candidate	Votes	%	±%
Labour	Patricia Midgley*	1,621	52.9	−7.7
Liberal Democrats	David Croft	687	22.4	+5.4
Conservative	Christina Stark	400	13.1	+3.2
Green	Graham Wroe	357	11.6	−0.9
Majority		934	30.5	−13.1
Turnout		3,065	27.3	−0.4
Labour hold		Swing		

=== Mosborough ===
Mosborough
Party	Candidate	Votes	%	±%
Liberal Democrats	Gail Smith	2,451	50.8	+17.0
Liberal Democrats	Christopher Tutt	2,019	41.9	+8.1
Labour	Sarah Cullen	1,660	34.4	−7.3
Labour	Andrew Peat*	1,626	33.7	−8.0
Conservative	Evelyn Millward	746	15.5	+0.2
Conservative	Margaret Pigott	561	11.6	−3.7
Green	Anwen Fryer	290	6.0	+2.4
Majority		359	7.5	N/A
Turnout		4,822	37.7	+4.0
Liberal Democrats gain from Labour		Swing		
Liberal Democrats gain from Labour		Swing		

=== Nether Edge ===
Nether Edge
Party	Candidate	Votes	%	±%
Liberal Democrats	Ali Qadar*	2,661	44.6	+5.6
Labour	Mohammed Hafiz	2,165	36.3	+5.5
Green	Mervyn Smith	780	13.1	−6.7
Conservative	Rosita Malandrinos	359	6.0	−4.4
Majority		496	8.3	+0.1
Turnout		5,965	47.0	+7.2
Liberal Democrats hold		Swing		

=== Richmond ===
Richmond
Party	Candidate	Votes	%	±%
Labour	Lynn Rooney	1,759	44.4	−7.4
Labour	Martin Lawton*	1,693	42.8	−9.0
Liberal Democrats	Anders Hanson	736	18.6	+2.8
Liberal Democrats	Barbara Masters	699	17.7	+1.9
Conservative	Ian Fey	618	15.6	+4.1
UKIP	Leslie Arnott	618	15.6	+6.2
Conservative	Maureen Neill	560	14.1	+2.6
Green	Eamonn Ward	439	11.1	+5.3
UKIP	Jennifer-Marie Ruchat	356	9.0	−0.4
Majority		957	24.2	−11.7
Turnout		3,959	31.0	−0.6
Labour hold		Swing		
Labour hold		Swing		

=== Shiregreen & Brightside ===
Shiregreen & Brightside
Party	Candidate	Votes	%	±%
Labour	Jane Bird*	1,757	44.1	−7.6
BNP	Tracey Smith	846	21.3	−2.5
Conservative	Eric Kirby	451	11.3	+3.7
Liberal Democrats	Tasadique Mohammed	350	8.8	−2.3
Independent	Glynn Tipper	350	8.8	N/A
Green	Steve Brady	227	5.7	−0.1
Majority		911	22.9	−5.0
Turnout		3,981	30.0	−0.7
Labour hold		Swing		

=== Southey ===
Southey
Party	Candidate	Votes	%	±%
Labour	Tony Damms*	1,695	41.9	−11.9
BNP	John Sheldon	1,031	25.5	+6.8
Liberal Democrats	John Bowden	716	17.7	+3.9
Conservative	Russell Cutts	437	10.8	+1.6
Green	Gemma Lock	162	4.0	−0.5
Majority		664	16.4	−18.7
Turnout		4,041	30.7	+1.4
Labour hold		Swing		

=== Stannington ===
Stannington
Party	Candidate	Votes	%	±%
Liberal Democrats	Arthur Dunworth*	2,713	46.7	−2.7
Labour	Alf Meade	1,314	22.6	−3.0
Conservative	Andrew Lee	883	15.2	−1.2
BNP	Martin Stevens	547	9.4	N/A
Green	Martin Bradshaw	351	6.0	−2.7
Majority		1,399	24.1	+0.3
Turnout		5,808	41.0	+0.6
Liberal Democrats hold		Swing		

=== Stocksbridge & Upper Don ===
Stocksbridge & Upper Don
Party	Candidate	Votes	%	±%
Liberal Democrats	Jack Clarkson	2,258	39.0	−0.3
Independent	Martin Davis*	1,371	23.7	N/A
Conservative	Matt Dixon	1,076	18.6	+1.0
Labour	Jim Bamford	761	13.4	−10.8
Green	Angela Roberts	327	5.6	−3.2
Majority		887	15.3	+0.2
Turnout		5,793	40.7	+4.2
Liberal Democrats hold		Swing		

Stocksbridge & Upper Don was a regain for the Liberal Democrats, after the sitting councillor became an Independent.

=== Walkley ===
Walkley
Party	Candidate	Votes	%	±%
Liberal Democrats	Diane Leek*	2,679	49.6	+8.2
Labour	Veronica Hardstaff	1,899	35.2	−5.5
Green	James Wilson	540	10.0	−1.6
Conservative	George Ledbury	283	5.2	−1.1
Majority		780	14.4	+13.7
Turnout		5,401	40.0	+1.4
Liberal Democrats hold		Swing		

=== West Ecclesfield ===
West Ecclesfield
Party	Candidate	Votes	%	±%
Liberal Democrats	Kathleen Chadwick*	2,763	52.4	+0.1
Labour	Max Telfer	1,130	21.5	−9.4
BNP	Malcolm Woodhead	630	12.0	N/A
Conservative	Robert McIlveen	552	10.5	−0.7
Green	Kathryn Aston	193	3.7	−1.8
Majority		1,633	31.0	+9.6
Turnout		5,268	37.4	+2.2
Liberal Democrats hold		Swing		

=== Woodhouse ===
Woodhouse
Party	Candidate	Votes	%	±%
Labour	Marjorie Barker*	2,041	47.6	−5.8
Conservative	Laurence Hayward	700	16.3	+4.4
Liberal Democrats	Christopher Bingham	661	15.4	+2.6
UKIP	Jonathan Arnott	593	13.8	−2.0
Green	John Grant	291	6.8	+0.6
Majority		1,341	31.3	−6.3
Turnout		4,286	33.0	+0.1
Labour hold		Swing		

== By-elections between 2008 and 2010 ==
East Ecclesfield By-Election 30 April 2009
Party	Candidate	Votes	%	±%
Liberal Democrats	Colin Taylor	2,239	44.3	+1.3
Labour	Zoe Sykes	1,420	28.1	−2.1
BNP	John Sheldon	719	14.2	+1.6
Conservative	John Hattersley	564	11.2	+0.4
Green	Mia Safir	107	2.1	−1.3
Majority		819	16.2	+3.3
Turnout		5,049	36.0	−2.4
Liberal Democrats hold		Swing	+1.6	
