= Andrew Cooper, Baron Cooper of Windrush =

British politician and life peer (born 1963)

The Right Honourable The Lord Cooper of Windrush

Member of the House of Lords
- Lord Temporal
- Life peerage 17 September 2014

Director of Strategy to the Prime Minister
- In office 2 May 2012 – October 2013
- Prime Minister: David Cameron
- Preceded by: Steve Hilton
- Succeeded by: Auriol Miller

Personal details
- Born: 9 June 1963 (age 63)
- Party: SDP (1981–88) 'Continuing' SDP (1988–90); Conservative (1992–2019); Non-affiliated (since 2019)
- Spouse: Elizabeth Campbell (m. 2000)
- Children: 3
- Education: London School of Economics

Andrew Timothy Cooper, Baron Cooper of Windrush (born 9 June 1963) is a British politician and former Director of Strategy in the Cameron–Clegg coalition. He entered the House of Lords as a Conservative peer, but was suspended from the party whip and membership for endorsing the Liberal Democrats in the 2019 European Parliament elections.

== Personal life ==
Andrew Cooper was born in Twickenham, and educated at Reigate Grammar School, Reigate, Surrey (where his classmates included future British Prime Minister Keir Starmer and the future American-based conservative journalist Andrew Sullivan), and at the London School of Economics, where he graduated with a BSc (Econ) in 1985. He is married and has three daughters.

== Politics ==
Cooper was a member of the Social Democratic Party (SDP) from 1981 to 1988. He worked for the SDP in its policy department from 1986 to 1988 and then, after declining to join the new party merged out of the old Liberal Party and a majority of the SDP, became a member of the 'continuing' SDP and was employed by its leader David Owen as a parliamentary researcher and policy adviser. In the run-up to the 1992 election he was among the group of young former SDP members, led by his close university friend Daniel Finkelstein, who publicly backed John Major and the Conservative Party.

He worked for the Conservatives from 1995 to 1999, first as deputy director of the Conservative Research Department, overseeing the party's private opinion polling and then, after the 1997 landslide election defeat, Director of Strategy to then party leader William Hague. He wrote and presented a modernising strategy for Conservative recovery ('Kitchen Table Conservatives') in 1998. Described by Financial Times political commentator Janan Ganesh as "the first moderniser", Lord Cooper has been a continuous voice for modernisation, writing numerous papers, articles, presentations and book chapters (including 'A party in a foreign land' in Blue Tomorrow, edited by Nick Boles, Michael Gove and Ed Vaizey, in 2001). He is a member of the Advisory Boards of the Conservative modernising organisations Bright Blue and Renewal.

Cooper was created Baron Cooper of Windrush, of Chipping Norton in the County of Oxfordshire, on 17 September 2014.

== Work as pollster ==
Lord Cooper is a co-founder of the research and strategy consultancy Populus Ltd. He took a leave of absence from Populus to serve from March 2011 to October 2013 as Director of Strategy in the Prime Minister's Office, 10 Downing Street, where he was architect of then Prime Minister David Cameron's policy on same-sex marriage.

When his Downing Street appointment was announced, New Labour strategist Philip Gould (Lord Gould of Brookwood) wrote of Cooper that "he is without doubt the best political pollster of his generation, and one of the few who knows how to fuse polling and strategy". The commentator Matthew d'Ancona in The Daily Telegraph (19 February 2011) wrote that Cooper's "great gift to the Conservative Party has not been liberal ideology, but a pitiless empiricism".

== In popular culture ==
Cooper was portrayed by actor Gavin Spokes in the 2019 HBO and Channel 4-produced drama entitled Brexit: The Uncivil War.

Orders of precedence in the United Kingdom
Preceded by The Lord Rose of Monewden	Gentlemen; Baron Cooper of Windrush	Followed by The Lord Scriven
