= GEOAmey =

British prisoner transport company

GEO Amey Limited
- Type: Private
- Industry: Prisoner transport
- Incorporated: England and Wales
- Founded: 8 March 2011
- Headquarters: Manchester, England
- Area served: United Kingdom
- Owner: GEO Group (50%); Amey (50%)
- Website: geoamey.co.uk

GEO Amey Limited, trading as GEOAmey, is a British company specialising in prisoner transport. It operates prisoner custody services for the Ministry of Justice in England and Wales, and the Scottish Prison Service in Scotland.

== Ownership ==
GEOAmey was formed in 2011 as a joint venture between GEO Group and Amey.

== Criticisms and incidents ==
In April 2012 GEOAmey attracted serious criticism from High Court judge Julian Flaux for "inexusable" delays in prisoner transport to court in Birmingham.

Prisoner Adam Herbert escaped from a GEOAmey van while being transported to court in Leicester on 26 December 2015.

In July 2018, two prisoners were freed from a GEOAmey van after it burst into flames on the M62 motorway in Cheshire, England.

In November 2024, two pedestrians were injured after being hit by a GEOAmey van in Doncaster, England. HM Inspectorate of Prisons for Scotland reported in December 2024 that problems with prison transport were causing many prisoners to miss hospital appointments and family funerals, and human rights of inmates were at risk of being violated because of unacceptable transport issues. GEOAmey cited multiple complex issues including staff shortages and COVID-19-related court backlogs as affecting its performance.

Prisoner Jamie Cooper escaped from a GEOAmey van in March 2025 on his way to court in Lancaster, England, after he faked a medical emergency.

Another prisoner, Stephen Grzyb, escaped from a GEOAmey transport whilst being moved from Belle Vale custody suite to Liverpool Magistrates' Court to face charges of burglary.

== See also ==
- Prisoner transport vehicle

== External sites ==
- Official website
