= Sheffield tree felling protests =

Former controversy in South Yorkshire, England

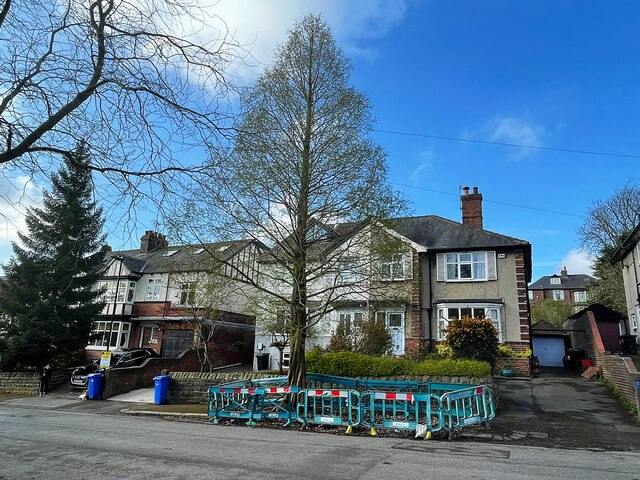
- Date: 2014–2018
- Location: Sheffield, South Yorkshire, England
- Caused by: Mass felling of healthy street trees across Sheffield since 2012 as part of the ‘Streets Ahead’ Private Finance Initiative (PFI) contract signed by Sheffield City Council (SCC), Amey plc and the Department for Transport
- Goals: Stopping unnecessary felling of healthy street trees in Sheffield
- Methods: Demonstrations
- Status: Tree felling has been paused since 2018 due to a new approach developed by Sheffield City Council for the maintenance of street trees. Widespread protests across the city have stopped as a result; The Sheffield Street Tree Partnership Strategy was signed jointly in 2021 by representatives of Sheffield City Council, Amey, the Sheffield and Rotherham Wildlife Trust, the Woodland Trust and the anti-felling campaigners in Sheffield Trees Action Groups (STAG) for ensuring the continued maintenance of the street trees around the city.

The Sheffield tree felling protests were a series of protests and unrest happening between 2014 and 2018 in Sheffield, South Yorkshire, England. The protests began as a response to the mass felling of healthy street trees across Sheffield since 2012 as part of the ‘Streets Ahead’ Private Finance Initiative (PFI) contract signed by Sheffield City Council (SCC), Amey plc and the Department for Transport.

The protests resulted in many arrests across the city along with threats of legal action against Sheffield City Council and Amey plc in order to help prevent unnecessary felling of street trees in Sheffield. Due to a pause of tree felling in 2018 as part of a new approach developed by Sheffield City Council to maintain street trees, there have been no widespread protests around the city since 2018. The Sheffield Street Tree Partnership Strategy was signed jointly in 2021 by representatives of the City Council, Amey, the Sheffield & Rotherham Wildlife Trust, the Woodland Trust and the anti-felling campaigners in Sheffield Trees Action Groups (STAG) to ensure the continued maintenance of the street trees around the city.

== History ==
=== ‘Streets Ahead’ contract ===
==== 2012 ====
The £2.2 billion ‘Streets Ahead’ Private Finance Initiative (PFI) contract was signed by Sheffield City Council (SCC), Amey plc and the Department for Transport. It was planned to be a 25 year contract between 20 August 2012 and 19 August 2037 for highway, pavement and street light renewal, and included the management of Sheffield’s highway trees. SCC indicated that up to 10,000 trees would be felled and replaced although wording in the PFI contract indicated a target of 17,500. SCC initially denied that 17,500 was an actual target, however, evidence from an SCC Cabinet Meeting found that in 2010 that SCC planned to remove and replant 17,500 trees as part of the PFI contract.

At the start of the PFI contract, Acorn Environmental Management Group (AEMG) were sub-contracted by Amey to re-survey Sheffield’s highway trees. A 2012 survey by Acorn stated that around 1,000 trees (dead, dying, diseased, dangerous) would be felled along with raising 6,300 other pruning and maintenance jobs. Steve Robinson, SCC’s Head of Highway Maintenance, stated in an interview by The Chartered Institution of Highways & Transportation that half of the city’s 36,000 highway trees would be felled and replaced with saplings.

==== 2013 ====
Highway officials in February 2013, stated in an interview with the Sheffield Star that 1,250 trees across the city would be felled and replaced, with more than a hundred street trees being considered for felling if they were considered to be damaging road surfaces or causing a hazard.

=== Tree felling protests ===
==== 2014 ====
In January 2014, controversy flared in Stocksbridge around the felling of a 450-year-old Melbourne Oak. Despite local protests and an expert survey showing that the tree was ‘uncompromised’ the tree was felled anyway. In September 2014, residents of Heeley campaigned to prevent the felling of 189 mature trees that were to make way for a bus-lane, resulting in those trees being saved.

==== 2015 ====
In May, the first tree campaign group for the city Save Our Rustlings Trees was formed before being later renamed ‘Save Our Roadside Trees’. This was then followed by the formation of Sheffield Tree Action Groups (S.T.A.G.) in August. Later in the year, local tree campaign groups were formed in Crookes, Dore, Gleadless Valley, Nether Edge and Rivelin Valley.

SCC launched the Independent Tree Panel in November, whose members would provide advice over whether a tree should be saved or not. Over time, the majority of the Independent Tree Panel's recommendations to save trees were ignored by Amey and the Council.

In November 2015, SCC launched public ‘consultations’ which were hand-delivered to local residents on a street-by-street basis, called ‘The Independent Tree Panel Household Survey’. Emeritus Professor Greg Brooks, of The University of Sheffield, criticised the validity of the survey method in an expert analysis showing why the ‘Household Survey’ is unrepresentative and undemocratic. STAG carried out door-to-door surveys by speaking to residents, with those figures differing from those carried out by Amey. Some have labelled the ‘Household Survey’ ‘divisive’ and a threat to the strong community bonds of the city.

By the end of 2015, 3,068 trees had been felled across the city.

==== 2016 ====
In February 2016, the High Court issued an interim injunction, ordering the council to halt felling from February to April 2016. In June 2016, once the three-month injunction came to an end, felling recommenced on trees on Bannerdale Road and South Yorkshire Police (SYP) were involved for the first time.

In November 2016, during a peaceful campaign to protect a tree on Marden Road, involving five residents and members of STAG, two people were arrested under Section 241 of the Trade Union and Labour Relations Act (1992), designed to deal with ‘Flying Pickets.’ The validity of these charges against people exercising their right to peaceful protest was hotly disputed by STAG.

On 17 November 2016, under Julie Dore's leadership, a felling of eight trees took place around 4 am at the Rustlings Road area of Sheffield, leading to the arrest of three peaceful protesters, under section 241 of the Trade Union and Labour Relations (Consolidation) Act 1992. The tree felling programme sparked the sign-up of over 9,900 members to STAG's Facebook group against the mass removal of Sheffield's street trees.

==== 2017 ====
A Green Party councillor and six other protesters were arrested in February 2017, during a protest to prevent a tree from being felled in Chippinghouse Road, Nether Edge.

In August 2017, about 5000 trees had been felled since 2012 and Sheffield City Council won a court battle in order to bring injunctions against protesters considered to take unlawful action to prevent trees from being felled.

==== 2018 ====
In January 2018, a man was arrested, but not charged, for allegedly attacking a police officer during a felling protest at Meersbrook Park Road before another man was arrested five days later for another felling at the same location. Three people were arrested in February 2018 during a protest to stop trees from being felled at Thornsett Road, Nether Edge. In March 2018, two men were arrested for protesting against the tree felling at Kenwood Road, Nether Edge, with one of the campaigners being forcibly removed from under a vehicle. Two women were arrested later in March for protesting against the felling of lime trees in Chatsworth Road, Dore.

Following the controversy, there was a halt to the tree felling since March 2018. The pause lasted throughout the year whilst representatives from Sheffield City Council, Amey and Sheffield Tree Action Group held extended talks, mediated independently by the Bishop of Sheffield. Following this, about 200 trees which were due to be felled were retained. Following the mediated talks an action plan, which supports a new approach to managing the city's street trees, was agreed between the council and Sheffield Trees Action Groups (STAG). The plan claims to identify practical solutions for retaining more street trees as part of a new approach adopted by the council and its wider partners. There have been no widespread protests on this issue since.

Under Dore's leadership, SCC committed to a 15-year Woodlands Strategy which will see the planting of least 100,000 additional trees, and replace trees on a 2-for-1 basis in the city's green spaces and woodlands. It was also mentioned in January 2018 that 1,200 new highway trees would be planted during winter 2018, including trees historically felled and not replanted.

=== End of protests ===
==== 2019 ====
In February 2019, seven campaigners who were arrested between November 2016 and February 2017 were awarded a wrongful arrest payout of £24,300 along with a drop of criminal charges. A year-long investigation found that the council deliberately misled residents over the tree felling programme. In December 2019, SCC apologised for the initial strategy admitting that they 'got things wrong', and argued they had a renewed commitment to the city's trees and highway network, whilst promising to continue the collaboration with STAG, which was warmly welcomed by the group's co-chair.

==== 2020 ====
In 2020, it was reported that a peace deal had been drawn up between the protesters and SCC based on a shared vision for the city's trees, helping to shape a final plan which was due for Spring 2021, potentially ending the eight-year unrest.

==== 2021 ====
In 2021, a pledge to deliver the Sheffield Street Tree Partnership Strategy was signed jointly by representatives of Sheffield City Council, Amey, the Sheffield and Rotherham Wildlife Trust, the Woodland Trust and the anti-felling campaigners in STAG to ensure the continued maintenance of the street trees around the city. Investigations into the tree felling programme are however still continuing due to the volume of documents involved, despite it being expected to be completed in May.

==== 2022 ====
In May 2022, Sheffield was named a "Tree City of the World" in recognition of its work to sustainably manage and maintain urban forests and trees.

== Reactions ==
Campaigners have alleged that the tree felling makes road maintenance and resurfacing cheaper over the 25-year contract, and helps corporate profit at the expense of the environment.

Politician and then Environment Secretary Michael Gove accused Sheffield City Council of "environmental vandalism" and promised to do "anything required" to end its tree-felling programme while former Liberal democrat leader Nick Clegg branded the tree felling a "national scandal".

Writer Robert Macfarlane took part in the campaign, writing a poem for the protestors called 'Heartwood', which was set to music, flyposted, subvertised and hung as a 'charm' around endangered trees across Sheffield. Former Pulp frontman and musician Jarvis Cocker branded the felling of the street trees as "crazy" and joined fellow singer Richard Hawley to DJ at an event in raising funds for the Sheffield Tree Action Group in March 2018. Cocker later gave a speech in April 2018 at a protest in Sheffield City Hall, speaking out in support of the tree campaigners in Sheffield. Environmentalist Rob McBride, (aka the tree hunter), instigated a successful, high-profile contest. The Great Trees of Sheffield was launched in January 2017 to help raise awareness of the street tree situation and campaigns. Judges featured, Jarvis Cocker, Richard Hawley, Chris Packham, Nick Clegg, Patrick Barkham and Christine Walkden.
