= Paul Scriven, Baron Scriven =

British politician (born 1966)

The Right Honourable The Lord Scriven
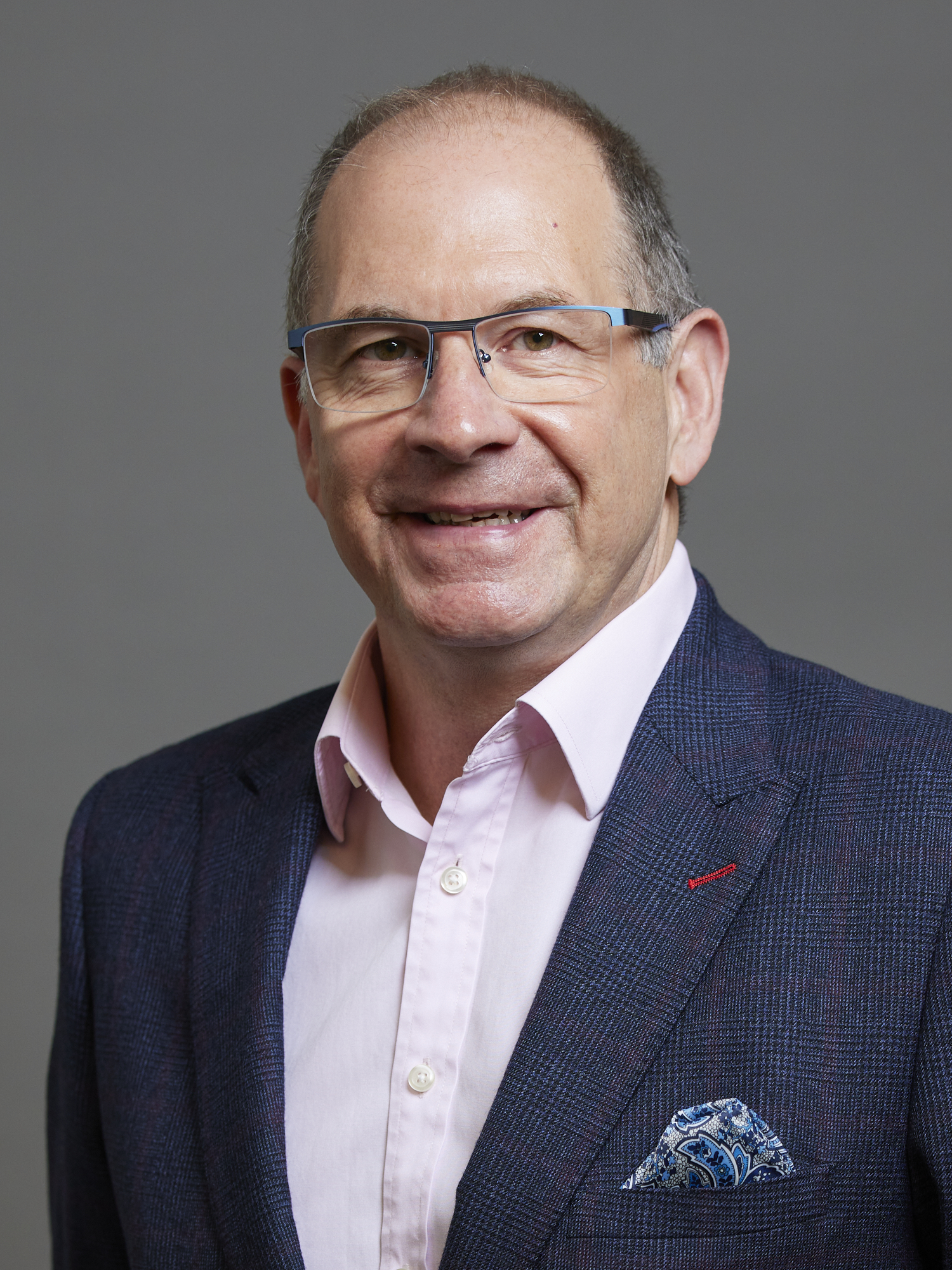
- Official portrait, 2022

Leader of Sheffield City Council
- In office 2008–2011
- Preceded by: Jan Wilson
- Succeeded by: Julie Dore

Member of the House of Lords
- Lord Temporal
- Life peerage 19 September 2014

Personal details
- Born: Paul James Scriven; 7 February 1966 (age 60)
- Party: Liberal Democrats
- Spouse: David Black (m. 2017)
- Education: Manchester Polytechnic

Paul James Scriven, Baron Scriven (born 7 February 1966), is a Liberal Democrat politician and life peer. Leader of Sheffield City Council from 2008 to 2011, he was once described as Nick Clegg's "closest ally in local government". Scriven has been a member of the House of Lords since 2014.

== Early and professional life ==
Scriven was raised on a council estate in Huddersfield in the West Riding of Yorkshire. He was educated at Rawthorpe High School, Huddersfield. After working for two years for a road construction firm, he returned to education at 18 to study his O-levels and A-levels at Huddersfield Technical College. He attended Manchester Polytechnic (later Manchester Metropolitan University) to read for a BA. From 1989 to 1990 he was president of its students' union.

He started his graduate working life on the 'fast tracked' general management trainee scheme in the National Health Service. After the scheme he worked at a number of NHS hospitals and NHS organisations in senior roles. He left the NHS after 10 years to work for a number of private companies that worked alongside public services. Outside politics, Scriven is self employed, working in consultancy and leadership development.

In 2020 Scriven was awarded an honorary doctorate from Manchester Metropolitan University for his services to public sector reform and international LGBT asylum issues. Scriven undertook to support the university's first generation programme of supporting more people to go the university from households with a history of family members not entering higher education.

== Political career ==
Scriven was elected to Sheffield City Council in May 2000 for the Broomhill ward and became Leader of the Liberal Democrat Group in 2002. He then became Leader of the Council in 2008, following the local elections which saw the Liberal Democrats take control of Sheffield City Council.

At the 2010 general election, he was the Liberal Democrat candidate for the Sheffield Central constituency, nearly gaining a solid Labour seat which was narrowly held by Paul Blomfield. Scriven missed out by just 165 votes.

Following the 2010 election, Scriven remained as Leader of the Council and, in November of that year, he received a Leader Award from the Alliance of Liberals and Democrats for Europe, awarded annually to "recognise... the work of outstanding local and regional liberal and democrat politicians".

In April 2011, The Guardian newspaper described Scriven as the "closest ally in local government" to Deputy Prime Minister Nick Clegg MP. In the article, he discussed the coalition government's decision to "front-load" local government spending cuts and claimed it was right to do so, saying it would not have worked to stage the reductions across four years.

In the May 2011 local elections in Sheffield, Labour regained control of the Council and Scriven resigned as Leader of the Liberal Democrat Group. A year later in the 2012 elections, Scriven lost his Broomhill seat.

On 8 August 2014 it was announced that Scriven had been appointed as a Liberal Democrat life peer. He was created Baron Scriven, of Hunters Bar in the City of Sheffield, on 23 September 2014. During his time in the Lords Scriven has worked on issues around human rights abuses in Bahrain and Gulf states, improving the immigration system especially for LGBT+ applicants, campaigning for a federal UK through the regions with proper fiscal devolution, local government reform, NHS reform and social care issues as well highlighting civil liberties issues related to technology and IT. Following the preventable death of his nephew, Myles Scriven, in 2023, Lord Scriven has become a highly focused and key advocate for improving health and social care services for people with learning disabilities. He has been a vocal critic of the lack of action and accountability in closing the 20-year life expectancy gap for people with a learning disability

During the 2015 general election campaign, Lord Scriven made media headlines when he claimed on Twitter that Cameron had privately told Clegg that he did not believe the Conservatives would win a majority in a conversation before the election campaign. In the end, the Conservatives won a surprise majority.

In May 2016, Scriven was again elected onto Sheffield City Council, for the ward of Ecclesall Ward. He announced that he would not be seeking re-election to the Council when his term ended in May 2019.

Scriven became the first man in the modern House of Lords (other than clergymen) to speak without a tie in a debate in July 2017.

Scriven was joint acting Liberal Democrat frontbench spokesperson for Health in the Lords during 2020 at the start of the Coronavirus pandemic. He advocated for an equal partnership between local and national government that he said was vital to deal with public health issues that would arise. He also called for a locally led test and trace system along with realistic support for those who are required to self isolate. Scriven was outspoken in pursuit of holding Conservative Ministers to account for the cronyism in awarding of contracts during the pandemic via the "fast track" channel.

In October 2024, Lord Scriven was appointed as the Liberal Democrat frontbench spokesperson for Health & Social Care in the House of Lords. He stood down from this post in May 2026 to "focus on a national scandal: the 20-year life expectancy gap for those with learning disabilities. The time for talk is over. My focus now is driving the legislative changes needed to fix this"

== Personal life ==
Scriven resides both in the Hunter's Bar area of Sheffield, which forms the territorial designation of his title and Saltburn-by-the-Sea in Teesside.

He is a keen walker and cyclist, and is knowledgeable about the Scottish whisky trade. He is a lifelong supporter of Huddersfield Town A.F.C..

In June 2017, Scriven married Dr. David Black, who had been his partner of twenty-two years.

Political offices
Preceded by Jan Wilson	Leader of Sheffield City Council; 2008–2011	Succeeded by Julie Dore
Orders of precedence in the United Kingdom
Preceded by The Lord Cooper of Windrush	Gentlemen; Baron Scriven	Followed by The Lord Lennie
