= Julie Dore =

British Labour Party politician

Leader of Sheffield City Council
- In office 18 May 2011 – 6 January 2021
- Preceded by: Paul Scriven
- Succeeded by: Bob Johnson

Member of Sheffield City Council for Park and Arbourthorne Ward
- In office 5 May 2016 – May 2021
- Preceded by: Ward created

Member of Sheffield City Council for Arbourthorne Ward
- In office 10 June 2004 – 5 May 2016
- Preceded by: Ward created
- Succeeded by: Ward abolished

Member of Sheffield City Council for Park Ward
- In office 19 October 2000 – 10 June 2004
- Succeeded by: Ward abolished

Personal details
- Party: Labour
- Children: 2
- Education: Hurlfield School

Julie Dore is a British Labour Party politician, who was Leader of Sheffield City Council from May 2011 until January 2021, on which she represents Arbourthorne. She has been a member of Sheffield City Council since she was elected to the predecessor Park Ward in a by-election in October 2000. In 2008 she became Chair of a Council Scrutiny Board, and in May 2010 she joined the Shadow Cabinet.

On 11 February 2020 Dore announced that she would not contest her seat at the upcoming local elections in May, and would stand down as leader of the council. However, following the outbreak of COVID-19 pandemic in the UK, and the subsequent postponing of the elections until 2021, Dore stated that she would remain as Leader during this "difficult period".

== Personal life ==
Dore grew up in Wybourn and Arbourthorne, attending Hurlfield School. She lives in Gleadless with two sons.

== Career ==
For more than two decades, she worked for a social housing association. For 10 years, she worked in the construction industry.

As leader of Sheffield City Council, Dore was one of the political leaders of the Sheffield City Region Combined Authority – the others Council Leaders from Barnsley, Doncaster and Rotherham – to agree to the South Yorkshire devolution deal in 2020, alongside Sheffield City Region Mayor Dan Jarvis. The devolution agreement should see the City Region Mayor able to invest £900 million over thirty years, as well as increased power over transport, strategic planning and skills in the region.

Dore was also a Member of the HS2 Growth Taskforce. The taskforce published its final report in July 2014.

== Tree felling ==
Dore has come into the public spotlight concerning the mass tree felling across Sheffield as part of the controversial Streets Ahead programme. As part of the £2.2 billion Private Finance Initiative (PFI) partnership with Amey Plc, a large proportion of street trees across Sheffield are to be felled and replaced. Sheffield City Council (SCC) indicate that up to 10,000 trees are to be replaced although wording in the PFI contract indicates a target of 17,500. SCC have denied that 17,500 is an actual target. However, there is evidence from an SCC Cabinet Meeting that in 2010 that SCC planned to remove and replant 17,500 trees as part of the PFI contract and an interview with the SCC Head of Highways in December 2012 indicated the Contract would include replacement of "half of the city's 36,000 highway trees".

Campaigners have alleged that this makes road maintenance and resurfacing cheaper over the 25-year contract, and helps corporate profit at the expense of the environment.

On 17 November 2016, under Dore's leadership, colleague Councillor Bryan Lodge sanctioned a 4am felling of eight trees from the Rustlings Road area of Sheffield, leading to the arrest of three protesters, under section 241 of Trade Union Relation Act, a law normally used in the event of industrial action. The tree felling programme sparked the sign-up of over 9,900 members to Sheffield Tree Action Groups (STAG) Facebook group against the mass removal of Sheffield's street trees.

Following the controversy there was a halt to the tree felling in March 2018. The pause lasted throughout the year whilst representatives from Sheffield City Council, Amey and Sheffield Tree Action Group held extend talks, mediated independently by the Bishop of Sheffield. Following this there was a U-turn from the council with nearly 200 trees due to be felled now retained. Following the mediated talks an action plan, which supports a new approach to managing the city's street trees, was agreed between the council and Sheffield Trees Action Groups (STAG). The plan claims to identify practical solutions for retaining more street trees as part of a new approach adopted by the council and its wider partners. There have been no widespread protests on this issue since. In December 2019 SCC apologised for the initial strategy admitting that they 'got things wrong', and argued they had a renewed commitment to the city's trees and highway network, whilst promising to continue the collaborative with STAG, which was warmly welcomed by the group's co-chair.

Under Dore's leadership SCC committed to a 15-year Woodlands Strategy which will see the planting of least 100,000 additional trees, and replace trees on a 2-for-1 basis in the city's green spaces and woodlands.

== Political views ==
In the 2020 Labour Party leadership election Dore stated, "I do not want a continuity Corbyn candidate. It was the most disastrous result ever and we can't just change the face, change the name, change the gender maybe, and just continue and do what we’ve done before".

Political offices
Preceded by Paul Scriven	Leader of Sheffield City Council; 2011–2021	Succeeded by Bob Johnson
