= 2003 Sheffield City Council election =

- 1 May 2003

One third of seats (29 of 87) to Sheffield City Council 44 seats needed for a majority
	First party	Second party	Third party
Party	Labour	Liberal Democrats	Conservative
Seats won	17	12	0
Seat change	▲6	▼5	▼1
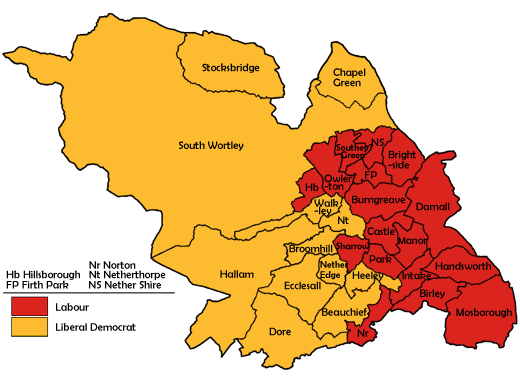
- Map showing the results of the 2003 Sheffield City Council elections.
Majority party before election
No Overall Control
Majority party after election
Labour

The 2003 Sheffield Council election took place on 1 May 2003 to elect members of Sheffield City Council. One third of the council was up for election, and Labour took control of the council from no overall control, with six gains from the Liberal Democrats.

The election saw a trial of electronic voting in half of the council's wards. Voters in these wards were able to vote by either text message, touch tone phone, internet, post, or use electronic kiosks as well as the normal polling stations. Overall turnout was 29.5%, a half a per cent fall on the previous year, a drop negated somewhat by the higher turnout in the wards trialing electronic voting.

== Election result ==
Sheffield local election result 2003
Party	Seats	Gains	Losses	Net gain/loss	Seats %	Votes %	Votes	+/−
Labour	17	6	0	+6	58.6	41.2	45,473	-3.3
Liberal Democrats	12	1	6	-5	41.4	36.2	39,951	-0.4
Conservative	0	0	1	-1	0	14.4	15,907	+0.8
Green	0	0	0	0	0	6.2	6,797	+2.8
BNP	0	0	0	0	0	0.9	989	N/A
Socialist Alliance	0	0	0	0	0	0.5	525	-0.2
UKIP	0	0	0	0	0	0.4	389	-0.1
Independent Labour	0	0	0	0	0	0.2	237	-0.2
Socialist Labour	0	0	0	0	0	0.1	109	±0.0
Socialist	0	0	0	0	0	0.1	87	±0.0

This result had the following consequences for the total number of seats on the council after the elections:

Party	Previous council	New council
Labour	43	49
Liberal Democrats	42	37
Conservatives	2	1
Total	87	87
Working majority	0	11

== Ward results ==
Beauchief
Party	Candidate	Votes	%	±%
Liberal Democrats	Andrew Sangar*	2,522	52.1	−0.1
Labour	William Breakell	1,297	26.8	−3.8
Conservative	Gordon Gregory	675	13.9	+1.0
Green	Christina Hespe	335	6.9	+6.9
Rejected ballots		11	0.2	
Majority		1,225	25.3	+3.6
Turnout		4,829	34.0	−2.6
Liberal Democrats hold		Swing	+1.9	

Birley
Party	Candidate	Votes	%	±%
Labour	Bryan Lodge	2,392	65.5	+7.6
Liberal Democrats	Judith Webster	814	22.3	−13.7
Conservative	Evelyn Millward	415	11.4	+5.5
Rejected ballots		28	0.8	
Majority		1,578	43.2	+21.2
Turnout		3,621	26.0	−8.0
Labour gain from Liberal Democrats		Swing	+10.6	

Brightside
Party	Candidate	Votes	%	±%
Labour	John Webster*	1,859	57.4	−14.1
BNP	Christopher Hartigan	587	18.1	+18.1
Liberal Democrats	Michael Reynolds	373	11.5	+1.8
Conservative	Patrick Maloney	297	9.2	−5.2
Socialist Labour	Brian Fischer	109	3.4	−0.6
Rejected ballots		13	0.4	
Majority		1,272	39.3	−16.0
Turnout		3,225	28.7	+5.1
Labour hold		Swing	-16.1	

Broomhill
Party	Candidate	Votes	%	±%
Liberal Democrats	Janice Sidebottom*	2,100	51.9	−3.4
Labour	Terence Cooper	704	17.4	−0.4
Conservative	Matthew Wilson	663	16.4	+2.1
Green	Gillian Booth	561	13.9	+2.8
Rejected ballots		14	0.3	
Majority		1,396	34.5	−3.0
Turnout		4,028	26.3	+0.3
Liberal Democrats hold		Swing	-1.5	

Burngreave
Party	Candidate	Votes	%	±%
Labour	Stephen Jones*	1,347	53.3	−7.8
Liberal Democrats	Joanna Hoogvelt	508	20.1	+1.0
Conservative	Nicholas Bryan	239	9.4	+2.2
Green	Christopher Sissons	215	8.5	+2.8
Socialist Alliance	Alison Brown	203	8.0	+1.8
Rejected ballots		14	0.5	
Majority		839	33.2	−8.9
Turnout		2,512	28.9	−0.7
Labour hold		Swing	-4.4	

Castle
Party	Candidate	Votes	%	±%
Labour	Patricia Midgley*	1,402	64.7	−5.3
Liberal Democrats	Michael Coleman	316	14.6	+1.7
Green	Graham Wroe	273	12.6	+3.2
Conservative	Michael Young	166	7.7	+0.3
Rejected ballots		8	0.4	
Majority		1,086	50.1	−7.1
Turnout		2,157	26.9	+2.6
Labour hold		Swing	-3.5	

Chapel-Green
Party	Candidate	Votes	%	±%
Liberal Democrats	Graham Oxley*	2,056	45.5	−2.9
Labour	Sheila Tyler	1,885	41.7	−1.3
Conservative	Miles Waters	343	7.6	−0.6
Green	Craig Scaman	204	4.5	+4.5
Rejected ballots		29	0.6	
Majority		171	3.8	−1.6
Turnout		4,488	24.7	−1.9
Liberal Democrats hold		Swing	-0.8	

Darnall
Party	Candidate	Votes	%	±%
Labour	Mary Lea	1,907	51.0	−2.3
Liberal Democrats	Shaffaq Mohammed	1,053	28.2	−0.1
UKIP	Jonathan Arnott	335	9.0	−0.5
Conservative	Gordon Millward	290	7.7	−0.6
Green	Linda Duckenfield	130	3.5	+3.5
Rejected ballots		21	0.5	
Majority		854	22.8	−2.2
Turnout		3,715	28.3	+4.0
Labour gain from Liberal Democrats		Swing	-1.1	

Dore
Party	Candidate	Votes	%	±%
Liberal Democrats	Keith Hill*	3,278	47.9	−0.8
Conservative	Michael Waters	2,401	35.0	−2.9
Labour	David Crosby	926	13.5	+2.9
Green	Dawn Biram	216	3.1	+0.6
Rejected ballots		27	0.4	
Majority		877	12.8	+2.1
Turnout		6,821	46.3	+1.6
Liberal Democrats hold		Swing	+1.0	

Ecclesall
Party	Candidate	Votes	%	±%
Liberal Democrats	Sylvia Dunkley*	3,698	52.1	−4.9
Conservative	Sidney Cordle	2,112	29.8	−1.1
Labour	John Darwin	788	11.1	−0.3
Green	Gemma Lock	471	6.6	+6.6
Rejected ballots		21	0.3	
Majority		1,586	22.4	−3.8
Turnout		7,069	47.3	+6.8
Liberal Democrats hold		Swing	-1.9	

Firth Park
Party	Candidate	Votes	%	±%
Labour	Mohammad Khan*	1,585	57.4	−22.8
Liberal Democrats	Anthony Holmes	569	20.6	+10.0
Conservative	Neville Paling	307	11.1	+2.8
Green	Steven Marshall	288	10.4	+10.4
Rejected ballots		14	0.5	
Majority		1,016	36.8	−32.8
Turnout		2,749	25.4	−0.1
Labour hold		Swing	-16.4	

Hallam
Party	Candidate	Votes	%	±%
Liberal Democrats	Leonard Hesketh*	3,338	49.7	−6.3
Conservative	Alan Ryder	1,985	29.6	−1.0
Labour	Dennis Brown	977	14.5	+1.4
Green	Robert Murphy	391	5.8	+5.8
Rejected ballots		23	0.3	
Majority		1,353	20.1	−5.3
Turnout		6,691	46.0	−0.2
Liberal Democrats hold		Swing	-2.6	

Handsworth
Party	Candidate	Votes	%	±%
Labour	Marjorie Barker*	2,209	60.9	−3.4
Liberal Democrats	Gail Smith	418	11.5	+0.1
BNP	Derek Hutchinson	402	11.1	+11.1
Conservative	Laurence Hayward	293	8.1	−2.1
Independent Labour	Elsie Smith	237	6.6	−7.3
UKIP	Charlotte Schofield	54	1.5	+1.5
Rejected ballots		11	0.3	
Majority		1,791	49.4	−3.5
Turnout		3,613	26.0	−0.8
Labour hold		Swing	-1.7	

Heeley
Party	Candidate	Votes	%	±%
Liberal Democrats	Theresa Hainey*	1,442	37.1	+2.5
Labour	Raja Shaffique	1,339	34.4	−9.5
Green	Robert Unwin	511	13.1	+1.5
Conservative	Trevor Grant	383	9.8	+4.5
Socialist Alliance	Richard Pitt	202	5.2	+0.9
Rejected ballots		11	0.3	
Majority		103	2.6	−6.7
Turnout		3,877	31.0	−3.0
Liberal Democrats hold		Swing	+6.0	

Hillsborough
Party	Candidate	Votes	%	±%
Labour	Janet Bragg	1,787	44.3	−3.5
Liberal Democrats	Vickie Priestley	1,581	39.2	+5.2
Conservative	Thomas Seaton	378	9.4	−0.4
Green	Christopher McMahon	271	6.7	+1.1
Rejected ballots		14	0.3	
Majority		206	5.1	−8.7
Turnout		4,017	29.0	−1.3
Labour gain from Liberal Democrats		Swing	-4.3	

Intake
Party	Candidate	Votes	%	±%
Labour	John Campbell	2,027	55.0	+1.9
Liberal Democrats	Frank Taylor*	1,049	28.5	−6.6
Conservative	Philip Kirby	367	9.9	+2.1
Green	Eamonn Ward	224	6.1	+2.6
Rejected ballots		16	0.4	
Majority		978	26.5	+8.5
Turnout		3,667	26.5	−3.2
Labour gain from Liberal Democrats		Swing	+4.2	

Manor
Party	Candidate	Votes	%	±%
Labour	Gillian Furniss*	1,354	74.8	−0.9
Liberal Democrats	Peter Huntsman	265	14.6	+0.3
Conservative	Andrew Watson	183	10.1	+0.2
Rejected ballots		7	0.4	
Majority		1,089	60.2	−1.1
Turnout		1,802	22.3	+0.5
Labour hold		Swing	-0.6	

Mosborough
Party	Candidate	Votes	%	±%
Labour	Christopher Rosling-Josephs*	3,119	55.2	−5.7
Liberal Democrats	Terence McElligott**	1,405	24.9	+5.2
Conservative	Shirley Clayton	1,084	19.2	+0.5
Rejected ballots		38	0.7	
Majority		1,714	30.3	−10.9
Turnout		5,608	21.3	−1.0
Labour hold		Swing	-5.4	

Terence McElligot was a sitting councillor for Darnall ward

Nether Edge
Party	Candidate	Votes	%	±%
Liberal Democrats	Patricia White*	2,476	50.7	+1.6
Labour	James Lafferty	1,314	26.9	−2.1
Green	Mervyn Smith	681	13.9	+4.3
Conservative	Quari Siddique	382	7.8	+0.4
Rejected ballots		32	0.6	
Majority		1,162	23.8	+3.7
Turnout		4,853	39.4	+0.6
Liberal Democrats hold		Swing	+1.8	

Nether Shire
Party	Candidate	Votes	%	±%
Labour	Peter Rippon	2,103	72.7	−4.5
Liberal Democrats	Allan Wisbey	456	15.7	+3.0
Conservative	Marie Weston	317	10.9	+1.3
Rejected ballots		17	0.6	
Majority		1,647	56.9	−7.6
Turnout		2,876	26.0	+2.1
Labour hold		Swing	-3.7	

Netherthorpe
Party	Candidate	Votes	%	±%
Liberal Democrats	Stephen Ayris	1,334	41.6	−3.6
Labour	Rosemary Telfer	1,044	32.5	−0.6
Green	Bernard Little	648	20.2	+3.3
Conservative	Paul Wallace	164	5.1	+0.9
Rejected ballots		17	0.5	
Majority		290	9.0	−2.9
Turnout		3,190	26.7	+1.4
Liberal Democrats gain from Conservative		Swing	-1.5	

Norton
Party	Candidate	Votes	%	±%
Labour	Beverley Wright	1,534	45.3	−2.3
Liberal Democrats	Ian Auckland*	1,507	44.5	+7.2
Conservative	Peter Smith	325	9.6	−0.4
Rejected ballots		19	0.5	
Majority		27	0.8	−9.6
Turnout		3,366	31.5	−1.2
Labour gain from Liberal Democrats		Swing	-4.7	

Owlerton
Party	Candidate	Votes	%	±%
Labour	Mark Wilde*	2,112	73.5	−3.5
Liberal Democrats	Valerie Moffett	454	15.8	+2.6
Conservative	Eric Kirby	292	10.2	+2.7
Rejected ballots		14	0.5	
Majority		1,658	57.7	−6.2
Turnout		2,858	27.6	+1.6
Labour hold		Swing	-3.0	

Park
Party	Candidate	Votes	%	±%
Labour	John Robson	1,252	71.2	+9.8
Liberal Democrats	Louise Truman	307	17.4	−11.2
Conservative	Amanda Gregory	102	5.8	+2.5
Socialist	Terence Wykes	87	4.9	+0.5
Rejected ballots		10	0.6	
Majority		945	53.7	+21.1
Turnout		1,748	20.0	−5.1
Labour gain from Liberal Democrats		Swing	+10.5	

Sharrow
Party	Candidate	Votes	%	±%
Labour	Mohammad Nazir*	1,288	42.0	−14.2
Green	Jillian Creasy	686	22.3	+10.1
Liberal Democrats	Haq Nawaz	678	22.1	+3.2
Conservative	Ian Ramsay	289	9.4	+1.8
Socialist Alliance	Angela Shann	120	3.9	−0.4
Rejected ballots		7	0.2	
Majority		602	19.7	−17.5
Turnout		3,061	27.1	+4.3
Labour hold		Swing	-12.1	

South Wortley
Party	Candidate	Votes	%	±%
Liberal Democrats	David Baker**	2,640	48.0	+3.2
Labour	Adele Jagger	2,002	36.4	−2.7
Conservative	Alexander Carroll	832	15.1	−0.6
Rejected ballots		29	0.5	
Majority		638	11.6	+5.9
Turnout		5,474	29.1	−1.2
Liberal Democrats hold		Swing	+2.9	

David Baker was a sitting councillor for Birley ward

Southey Green
Party	Candidate	Votes	%	±%
Labour	Anthony Damms*	1,707	79.5	−1.7
Liberal Democrats	John Bowden	241	11.2	−0.3
Conservative	Kevin Mahoney	181	8.4	+1.2
Rejected ballots		18	0.8	
Majority		1,466	68.3	−1.3
Turnout		2,129	23.6	+0.4
Labour hold		Swing	-0.7	

Stocksbridge
Party	Candidate	Votes	%	±%
Liberal Democrats	Martin Davis*	1,383	51.8	−8.8
Labour	Sandra White	911	34.1	+3.3
Conservative	Paula Axelby	177	6.6	−1.4
Green	Angela Roberts	175	6.5	+6.5
Rejected ballots		25	0.9	
Majority		472	17.7	−12.1
Turnout		2,646	25.0	−1.4
Liberal Democrats hold		Swing	-6.0	

Walkley
Party	Candidate	Votes	%	±%
Liberal Democrats	Jonathan Harston*	1,690	44.6	+4.0
Labour	Abdul Khayum	1,302	34.3	−8.8
Green	Nicola Freeman	517	13.6	+2.6
Conservative	Peter Smith	265	7.0	+2.1
Rejected ballots		16	0.4	
Majority		388	10.2	+7.6
Turnout		3,774	28.9	−3.3
Liberal Democrats hold		Swing	+6.4	
