= Stephen Toulson & Sons =

English sand and gravel business

- Founded: 1911
- Founder: Stephen Toulson
- Fate: Acquired by Amey Roadstone Construction
- Key people: Arthur Stephen Toulson; William Payling Toulson; Amos Christopher Toulson; John Foster Toulson

Stephen Toulson & Sons (ST&S) was a sand and gravel business established in Tinsley, Sheffield in 1911. The company played a role in the extraction and supply of essential construction materials in the north of England until it was acquired by Amey Roadstone Construction in 1974.

== History ==
In the early years, Stephen Toulson & Sons provided contract haulage services, offering horses, carts, equipment and the necessary logistics to fulfil contracts for the movement of construction materials in the Sheffield area to meet growing industrial demand. The company was also known as S. Toulson Carting Agents, S. Toulson and Sons Carting Contractors and also simply "The Toulson's". The founder, Stephen Toulson, established a reputation for fast, reliable delivery, and as a good employer. By 1920, ST&S operated a fleet of 22 horses, necessitating additional stabling near Tinsley Tram Terminus.

Stephen Toulson & Sons Ltd, was formed in December 1927. The registered office remained 312 Sheffield Road, Tinsley with Stephen Toulson Chairman. His four sons, Arthur Stephen Toulson 1890–1955; "Bill" William Payling Toulson 1892–1967; "Chris" Amos Christopher Toulson 1899–1977 and "Jack" John Foster Toulson 1901–1977 became Directors. The company became a regional producer and distributor of construction materials including sand, aggregate, quartzite and concrete across Yorkshire, Nottinghamshire, Derbyshire and Lincolnshire from the 1930s to the 1970s.

== Motor haulage ==
Circa 1921, ST&S transitioned to motor haulage. The company began to offer four and five ton petrol lorries for hire, and by 1935 had a fleet of 30 motor vehicles.

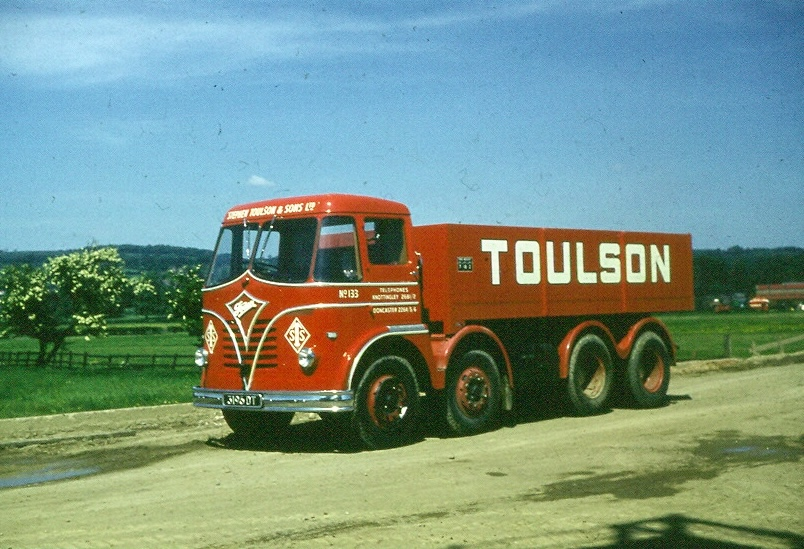
ST&S Foden no.133, Otley Quarry

== Sites and acquisitions ==
In 1928, the company raised mortgages for additional property in Sheffield and Knottingley, including 3 Shepcote Lane, Tinsley and Olympia Garage on Low Green, Knottingley, which Jack Toulson would operate to service and maintain the growing fleet of motor vehicles.

The company owned and operated 12 quarries including, Auckley, Huddersfield, Kiveton Park, Knottingley, Shireoaks, Tickhill, Welton-le-Wold, Worksop and Woodsetts. Otley quarry was developed in the mid-1930s and produced quartzite gravel from the river Wharf. In 1939, ST&S acquired two small companies in Scarborough; G. D. Pollard. and L. France & Co. with a licence to extract minerals from the seashore at Reighton Gap.

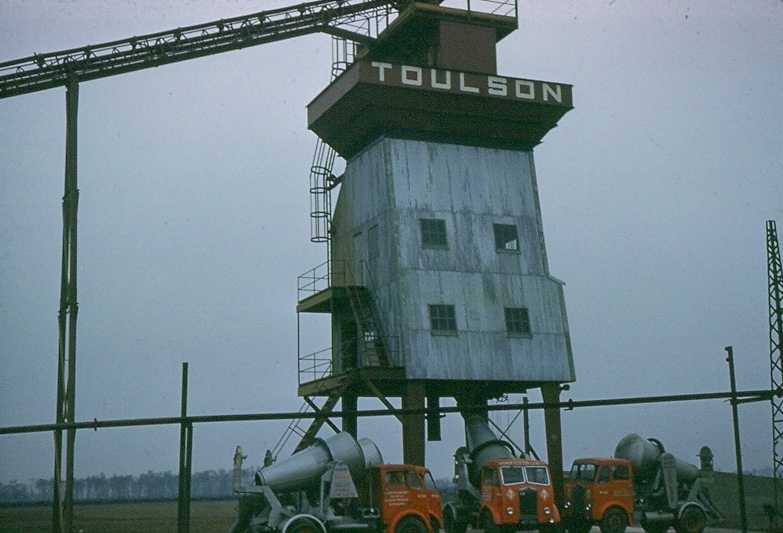
ST&S Concrete Plant, Auckley Quarry

Finningley Park Estate was bought in 1942 by ST&S Ltd and Yorkshire Amalgamated Products, forming the company Park Gravel Co. Ltd. Finningley Park comprised 1,096 acres of land under ST&S ownership, which would later become RAF Finningley and subsequently Robin Hood Airport, renamed Doncaster Sheffield Airport, operating 2005–2022. By the late 1950s ST&S had also acquired Park Gravel Co. Ltd.

== Second World War ==
Part of Finningley Park was requisitioned early in the Second World War, the land being returned to ST&S in 1945. ST&S materials were used to fill sand bags and vehicles repurposed for military action, transporting Italian Prisoners of War from camps to places of work. In 1941, the company also supported an ERF fund to buy a Spitfire, which was named "Sunworks" after the ERF factory.

== Notable contracts and partnerships ==
ST&S built a reputation for reliability and scale through the delivery of large contracts across the region, including the provision of 20,000 tons of sand and gravel and 5,000 tons of concrete to build Lewis's Superstore on The Headrow in Leeds in 1932; materials for the extension of Worksop College in 1931, Middleton Hospital in Sheffield in 1935 and delivering government and military contracts.

In addition to construction materials, the company provided approved sand for use on golf courses, tennis courts, bowling greens and lawns and were closely linked with the Board of Greenkeeping Research (Bingley, Yorkshire). ST&S sponsored events and advertised as specialists alongside news articles covering the annual conference between 1936 and 1939.

== Sale and transition of ownership ==
On 18 December 1974, the business was acquired by Amey Roadstone Construction, a prominent infrastructure support service provider. At the time of sale, ST&S employed 163 people and owned 4,195 acres of land.
