= Amey (company) =

British infrastructure support service provider

Amey Limited
- Type: Private
- Industry: Engineering
- Founded: 1921
- Founder: William Amey
- Headquarters: London, England
- Key people: Lord Moynihan (Chairman); Andy Milner (CEO)
- Products: Support services
- Revenue: £1.9 billion (2024)
- Operating income: £116 million (2024)
- Number of employees: 10,978 (2024)
- Parent: Buckthorn Partners; One Equity Partners
- Website: amey.co.uk

Amey Limited, previously known as Amey plc and Amey Roadstone Construction, is a British engineering company that specialises in infrastructure support services.

Amey was founded by William Amey in 1921. The firm grew rapidly during World War II via government infrastructure contracts. In 1959, it was contracted to supply gravel for the construction of the M1 motorway. In 1963, Amey was listed for the first time on the London Stock Exchange. Between 1972 and 1989, the company was owned by Consolidated Gold Fields. In 1995, Amey was relisted on the London Stock Exchange. Around this time, management decided to orientate the company towards support services delivery activities. In April 2003, Amey was acquired by the Spanish infrastructure services company Ferrovial.

During the early 21st century, Amey diversified into various market sectors, including criminal justice and railways. Between 2003 and 2010, it was responsible for maintaining, renewing and upgrading the infrastructure of three London Underground lines as a member of the Tube Lines consortium. As of 2026, Amey operates the Docklands Light Railway and Manchester Metrolink tram concessions through its shareholding in KeolisAmey. Amey also operates within the civil engineering industry as a consultant, typically performing activities such as structural design, civil infrastructure, transport systems and asset management services.

Amey was sold to private equity firms Buckthorn Partners and One Equity Partners in October 2022.

== History ==
=== 20th century ===
Amey was founded in 1921 by William Amey; it was initially based in Oxfordshire and acted as quarry operator. During World War II, the company experienced significant growth due to its involvement in fulfilling wartime demands, including an arrangement that saw Amey participate in the construction of multiple air bases on behalf of the Royal Air Force. In 1959, the company was responsible for the supply of gravel for the construction of the M1 motorway between London and Birmingham. During that same year, Amey became a public company.

It was first listed on the London Stock Exchange in 1959. Ronald William Amey took over the business from his father, and agreed the sale of the company in 1972. The family had a close association with Abingdon School, where the Amey Theatre is named after them. For a time, the Amey head office was in Sutton Courtenay, Vale of White Horse, near Abingdon. Between 1972 and 1989, the company was owned by Consolidated Gold Fields, and used the names Amey Roadstone and ARC. During this period, Amey Roadstone continued to undertake several major projects on behalf of the British government, included construction work at Mount Pleasant Airfield on the Falkland Islands, which was completed in 1986. In 1974, the company bought Stephen Toulson & Sons.

During 1989, Hanson purchased Amey Roadstone from Consolidated Gold Fields, returning the firm back to private ownership. In 1995, Amey was refloated on the London Stock Exchange; around this time, the company's management team made the strategic decision to focus its efforts upon the support services delivery sector. In 1999, Amey acquired Comax, a secure services specialist.

=== 21st century ===
In April 2003, Amey was acquired by Ferrovial in a friendly takeover. A statement issued by Ferrovial noted that the purchase allowed it greater access to the lucrative British market, particularly for public–private partnerships. In February 2006, Amey acquired the highway and railway design consultancy, Owen Williams, allowing it to substantially grow its business and develop its own consultancy division.

During the early 21st century, a heavy emphasis was placed upon participating in Britain's railway industry. From 2003 to May 2010, Amey was a member of the Tube Lines consortium, that was responsible for the maintenance, renewal and upgrade of the infrastructure, including track, trains, signals, civil work and stations, on three London Underground lines. In 2010, Tube Lines encountered a funding shortfall for its upgrades and requested that Transport for London (TfL) provide an additional £1.75 billion to cover the shortfall; TfL refused and referred the matter to the arbiter, who stated that £400 million should be provided. Shortly following this event, Tube Lines was bought from Amey and Bechtel by TfL. Despite this, Amey continued to provide TfL with management and maintenance services for the Jubilee, Northern and Piccadilly lines until the end of 2017, at which point London Underground Limited took over from Amey.

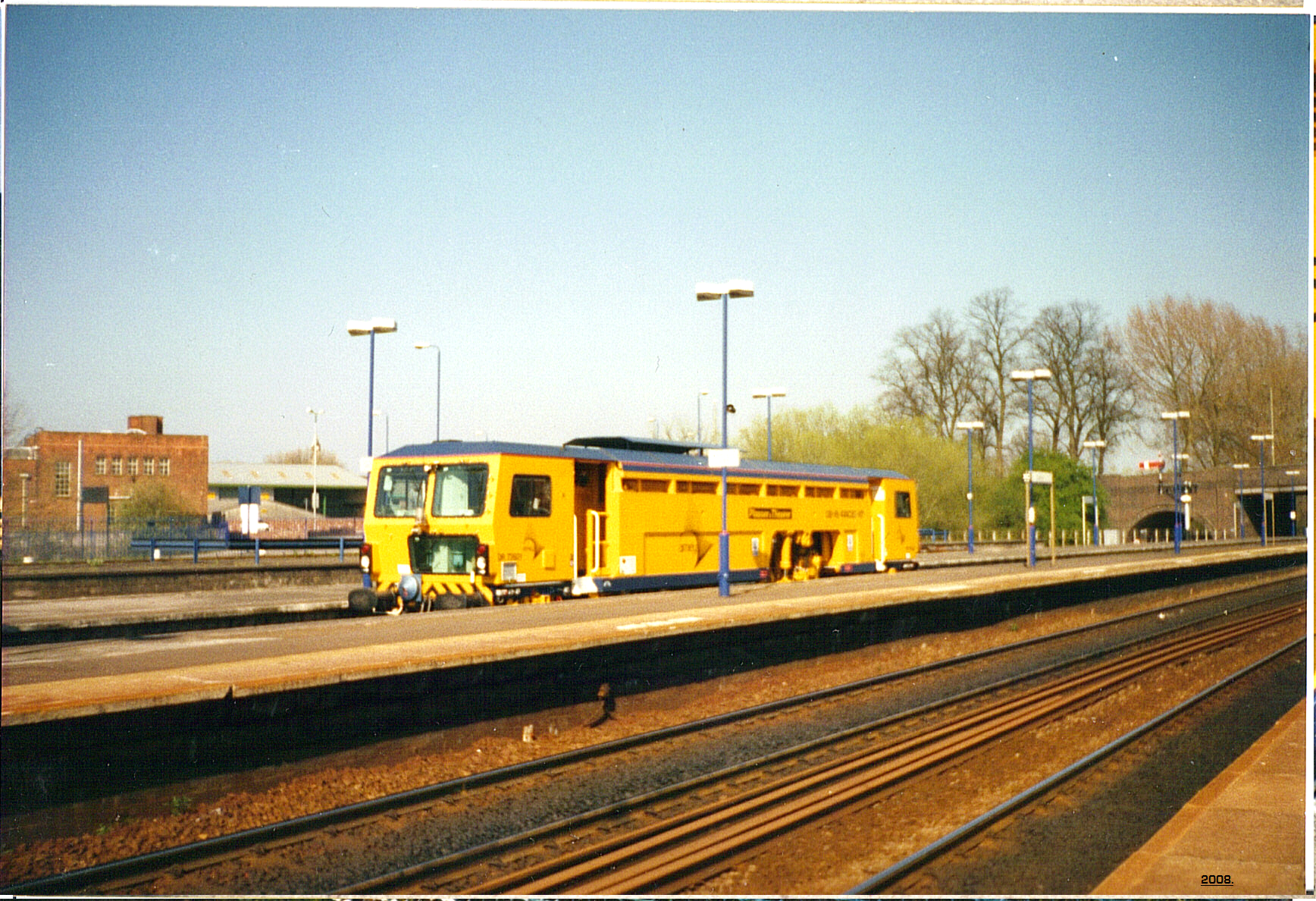
Amey ballast/track tamper train at Banbury station

In 2010, the firm expanded its presence in the waste management sector via the acquisition of waste disposal company Donarbon. That same year, Amey also acquired the rail consultancy arm of WYG Engineering Ltd, then Transportation Planning (International) Ltd in February 2011 and Aquatech Engineering in November 2014. During 2011, Amey began providing prisoner escort services through its 50% shareholding in GEOAmey winning contracts from the Ministry of Justice.

In April 2013, Amey completed the acquisition of utilities, waste and public service providers, Enterprise plc. In January 2016, Amey acquired Travel Point Trading Ltd (TPT), a strategic asset management consultancy with a strong presence in the rail sector in the United Kingdom.

In February 2018, Amey purchased Carillion's rail contracts with Network Rail in the East Midlands, London and the North West, following Carillion's liquidation during the previous month; this deal reportedly saved about 700 jobs. In August 2018, Amey completed the acquisition of Ministry of Defence (MoD) housing maintenance contracts previously run in joint venture with Carillion.

Amey retained its Oxfordshire links for a number of years, with their head office in the Sherard Building, Oxford Science Park, from 2004-2018. The company relocated to London in 2019.

In December 2018, Ferrovial offered Amey for sale. Ferrovial had posted a net loss of €72m for the first half of 2018 after allocating €237m for losses on Amey's highway maintenance contract with Birmingham City Council. In February 2019, Amey was close to a deal to exit its Birmingham contract, liabilities from which were preventing the company's sale by Ferrovial, who slashed the value of Amey by £660m, saying the "fair value" of Amey in the United Kingdom was £88m.

A £215m deal to terminate Amey's Birmingham contract was confirmed in July 2019. The council was set to receive £160m in 2019 with a further £55m paid over the next six years, with services continuing on an interim basis until September 2019, and potentially until March 2020. (However, in February 2020, it was announced the Birmingham contract would end in March 2020; Kier Group was appointed as interim contractor for 15 months while the council sought a permanent replacement for Amey.)

In July 2019, a £2.3bn management buyout of Amey, backed by private equity house Apax Partners, was being planned. The following day, Amey revealed a pre tax loss of £428m for the year to 31 December 2018. On revenues of £2.32bn, a £208,000 pre tax profit was wiped out by exceptional items, including £123m on the Birmingham highways contract, and a £314m write-down on Amey's waste collection and utilities businesses. In December 2019, Ferrovial started to offload loss making parts of the business in the United Kingdom, appointing PwC to find buyers for Amey's utilities and environmental services divisions.

On 10 December 2019, Amanda Fisher was appointed at the acting CEO of Amey. Fisher replaced former CEO Andy Milner, who had been in this role since March 2016 prior to leaving the firm. Between 2003 and 2016, Mel Ewell had served as Amey's CEO.

On 30 September 2020, Amey reported a £217m loss in the year to 31 December 2019, mainly due to its loss-making utilities and waste businesses - booked as discontinued operations - which recorded a loss of £97m, plus £159m of associated impairments. Revenue increased in continuing UK businesses by £325m to £1.9bn, helped by the 2018 acquisition of the other half of the Carillion/Amey Defence joint venture. Operating profit was £73.2m.

In February 2021, Ferrovial launched a fresh attempt to sell Amey, enlisting Morgan Stanley to run the sale. Amey's waste collection business had been acquired by Urbaser and Amey Utilities was sold, leaving the remaining business organised into three main divisions – transport infrastructure; secure infrastructure; and consulting services. On 7 February 2021, KeolisAmey transferred operation of Transport for Wales to a publicly-owned company, with Amey's role alongside Keolis being reduced to a continued partnership on the infrastructure and service improvements promised to Wales' rail network in the 2018 contract, such improvements will be conducted through AmeyKeolis Infrastructure.

In June 2021, Amey reported a £98m pre-tax loss for 2020, hit by loss-making contracts in highways and waste treatment. Plans to sell its waste collection and utilities businesses were progressing. Amey Utilities was bought by private equity investor Rubicon Partners, who rebranded the business as Avove in April 2022. Group revenue on continuing operations dropped 6% to £2.14bn. Parent Ferrovial planned to convert £112m in debt into equity to support the business, while also seeking to divest its services portfolio including Amey. A deadline for bids to buy Amey was set for August 2021. In September 2021, private investment firm Buckthorn, which included former Chancellor of the Exchequer Philip Hammond among its partners, was reported to be among at least two bidders for Amey. HIG Capital was subsequently confirmed as another bidder.

In April 2022, Transport Scotland named Amey as the preferred bidder for its roads maintenance contracts in north-east Scotland, an eight-year deal worth up to £540m.

In October 2022, Amey was sold to private equity firms Buckthorn Partners and One Equity Partners for £400 million. The deal excluded Amey's waste treatment business (which remained part of Ferrovial group) and, subject to regulatory approvals, was expected to complete by the end of 2022. Amey CEO Amanda Fisher would step down when the business was transferred to its new owners. Former Amey CEO Andy Milner was named as Fisher's successor, taking over when the sale was completed on 30 December 2022. In January 2023, Amey named former government minister Lord Colin Moynihan as its new chairman, succeeding Ian Tyler.

Also in January 2023, Amey acquired Leeds, UK-based data tracking specialist Citi Logik from its liquidators. It joined Amey Consulting’s Advisory & Analytics business, which already used data science for clients including Network Rail, National Highways and Transport for Wales.

In June 2024, Amey reported a post-tax profit of £84m for the year to December 2023 on revenue of £1.8bn.

== Operations ==
Amey works for the public and regulated sectors in the United Kingdom, selling services including highways and rail management and maintenance, facilities management, and consultancy services. Most of Amey's business is based in the United Kingdom; however it also operates in America, Australia and Qatar.

Amey is involved in consultancy in the civil engineering industry, with a wide range of design and asset management services offered. This includes structural design, civil infrastructure, transport systems and asset management services.

During the 2010s, Amey partnered with Canadian defense electronics specialist CAE Inc to form a joint venture company, AmeyVTOL, which specialises in the manufacture of unmanned aerial vehicles. The company's UAVs have been developed for the purpose of performing aerial surveys and asset inspections at beyond visual line of sight ranges, limiting the need for such activities to be performed by hand, particularly in locations that are difficult to access or pose risks to individuals; use of these platforms has been promoted to the rail industry in particular.

=== Rail ===
Amey operates two tram concessions through its KeolisAmey joint ventures with Keolis. KeolisAmey also operated a rail franchise in Wales from 2018 to 2021, and then continuing as an infrastructure partnership with Transport for Wales.

- Docklands Light Railway, since December 2014
- Manchester Metrolink, since July 2017
- Former KeolisAmey Wales, commenced operating the Wales & Borders franchise in October 2018, day-to-day operations were transferred to a publicly-owned company on 7 February 2021, with Amey retaining commitments to infrastructure with the new operator.

== Reputation issues ==
=== Blacklisting ===
Amey Construction was revealed as having been a paying subscriber to the United Kingdom's Consulting Association, which had been exposed in 2009 for operating an illegal construction industry blacklist.

=== Streets Ahead ===
In August 2012, Amey signed a twenty five year private finance initiative 'Streets Ahead' contract with Sheffield City Council to maintain the city's roads, pavements, street lights and highway trees. The replacement of up to 17,500 of the city's 36,000 highway trees was the subject of a campaign by local residents, who argued that the majority of the trees listed for felling were healthy and could be retained using sensitive engineering solutions.

According to the council, the 'Streets Ahead' tree strategy meant only trees which had been assessed as dead, dying, diseased, dangerous, damaging footpaths, private property or roads, or discriminatory by obstructing pavements were replaced. The ultimate decision was taken by the council. Over the course of the contract the overall number of highways trees would increase. On 26 March 2018, the city council announced an immediate pause of the tree felling scheme, following the wave of criticism and protests.

=== Overcharging ===
In 2016, Amey overcharged National Highways for temporary works on a damaged bridge in Northamptonshire. A 2022 report found that nothing could justify the £440,000 bill and provided an alternative estimate of under £131,000.

=== HMP Liverpool ===
On 9 March 2018, Amey lost an employment tribunal following the dismissal of two maintenance workers with over 45 years experience at HM Prison Liverpool. The two men had raised safety concerns and were then dismissed, but the employment tribunal ruled they had been unfairly dismissed by Amey.

=== COVID-19 pandemic ===
In March 2020, during the COVID-19 pandemic in the United Kingdom, an Amey HR executive said company workers would not receive any special sickness benefits as he believed coronavirus was "less severe" than normal influenza. In a statement, the company subsequently stated that the comments "does not reflect Amey's official position on Covid-19."

=== Below Inflation Pay ===
In 2022, video footage accidentally leaked showed bosses at Amey celebrating a £92m rise in profits whilst workers employed by the outsourcing company were paid 3 pounds less per hour than workers doing the same job employed directly by the council. CEO Amanda Fisher said most staff would be awarded a 4.21% pay rise, below the rate of inflation, which rose to 10.5% towards the end of the year. In the video obtained by The Guardian, Fisher, who was paid more than £750,000 in 2021, and the chief financial officer, Andrew Nelson, praise each other on an outstandingly good start to the year.
