= Tolson =

Tolson is a surname. Notable people with the surname include:

- Aaron Tolson, American tap dancer
- Chick Tolson (1898–1965), American baseball player
- Clyde Tolson (1900–1975), American Associate Director of the FBI
- Dean Tolson (born 1951), American basketball player
- Dickon Tolson, British actor
- Edgar Tolson (1904–1984), American woodcarver
- Jim Tolson, Scottish politician
- Joe P. Tolson (1941–2019), American politician
- John Tolson (academic) (died 1644), English academic administrator at the University of Oxford
- Max Tolson (born 1945), Australian football (soccer) forward
- Melvin B. Tolson (1900–1966), American writer
- Neil Tolson (born 1973), English footballer
