= Jan Wilson (British politician) =

English politician

Jan Wilson CBE (1944 – 2 August 2010) was a Labour councillor in Sheffield and formerly the leader of Sheffield City Council.

Her career outside politics saw her volunteer with the Citizens Advice Bureau in 1975, and she joined the staff in 1988, remaining until 2002.

She was Leader of the Labour Group on Sheffield City Council from 1998 until her death in 2010, and served twice as Leader of the Council, in 1998–99 and again in 2002–08. On both occasions, she lost office to opposition Liberal Democrats.

In December 2006, she was appointed a CBE for her public services.

In January 2007, Wilson announced that she had been diagnosed with lung cancer, but would be continuing in her role as leader of the council. She died of the illness on 2 August 2010, at the age of 66.

Political offices
Preceded by Mike Bower	Leader of Sheffield City Council; 1998–1999	Succeeded by Peter Moore
Preceded by Peter Moore	Leader of Sheffield City Council; 2002–2008	Succeeded by Paul Scriven
