= Sheffield City Council elections =

Local government elections in Sheffield, England

Sheffield City Council elections usually take place by thirds, three years out of every four. Sheffield City Council is the local authority for the metropolitan borough of Sheffield in South Yorkshire, England. Each of Sheffield's 28 wards is represented by three positions on the council, meaning there are usually 28 seats contested in each local election. 1967, 1973, 2004 and 2016 saw new ward boundaries and therefore all seats were contested.

== Council elections ==
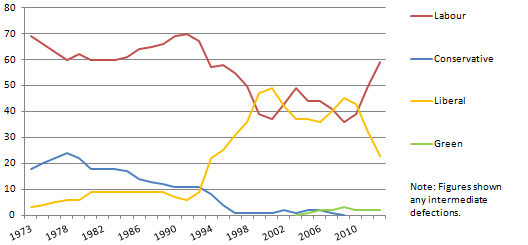
Seat total for parties, 1973-2012

Before 1974, elections were by thirds annually for a three-year term, with Aldermen elected from the body of councillors every three years. In 1974, Aldermen were abolished, and elections to Sheffield City Council are by thirds, in three years of every four, for a four-year term.

For twenty years from 1846, Isaac Ironside's Central Democratic Association was a force on the council. It then returned to typical Conservative–Liberal rivalry. Labour made little impact in its early years; by 1918, there were only three Labour councillors (and two Liberal-Labour, plus one Lib-Lab alderman). That all changed in 1919; Labour won almost all the seats up for election that year, giving them 12 and their coalition partners the Co-operative Party two. In response to their losses, the Conservative and Liberal groups merged to form the Citizens Association, retaining control with 32 councillors and 15 aldermen. The Lib-Labs remained unchanged in numbers and politically between the two groups.

Year	Conservative	Liberal	Liberal Unionist	Lib-Lab	Labour	Others
1881	34	30	-	-	-	-
1882	34	30	-	-	-	-
1883	36	28	-	-	-	-
1884	34	30	-	-	-	-
1885	33	31	-	-	-	-
1886	31	29	4	-	-	-
1887	30	30	4	-	-	-
1888	29	30	5	-	-	-
1889	30	30	5	-	-	-
1890	29	31	4	-	-	-
1891	30	31	3	-	-	-
1892	31	30	3	-	-	-
1893	36	25	-	3	-	-
1894	37	24	-	3	-	-
1895	39	22	-	3	-	-
1896	38	22	-	4	-	-
1897	36	23	-	6	-	-
1898	32	25	-	5	-	-
1899	34	25	-	5	-	-
1900	35	23	-	6	-	-
1901	29	29	-	6	-	-
1902	32	26	-	6	-	-
1903	32	26	-	5	-	-
1904	34	24	-	6	-	-
1905	30	26	-	7	1	-
1906	30	25	-	6	3	-
1907	31	24	-	5	4	-
1908	35	22	-	4	3	-
1909	35	22	-	4	3	-
1910	33	23	-	5	2	-
1911	29	30	-	4	1	-
1912	31	30	-	3	-	-
1913	32	27	-	3	2	-
1919	26	22	-	-	13	3
1920	24	21	-	-	13	6

Labour continued to advance at the expense of the Citizens Association. By 1922, there were 18 Labour councillors and one alderman; by 1925, 22 councillors and one alderman. At the 1926 elections, Labour rose to 29 councillors. A majority on the council and a large number of retiring aldermen finally enabled them to take 8 positions on the aldermanic bench.

The seats were redistributed into 24 wards in 1930, and the Citizens Association renamed itself the Progressive Party, and a further seat was added for Norton in 1934, taking the total number of positions to 75 councillors and 25 aldermen. That year, Labour briefly lost control, but regained it in 1934, with an increased majority of 12. This rose to 14 the following year. In 1945, Labour had 59 total seats to the Progressive's 39, one independent and one Communist. Labour continued to build its majority, to 34 in 1952 and 42 by 1958. However, it lost control to the Conservative Party, again standing on its own, in 1968-9.

Year	Labour	Citizens' Association / Municipal Progressive	Ind. Conservative	Ind. Liberal	Ind. Labour Party	Communist	Others
1921	19	38	1	2	-	-	8
1922	20	40	-	2	-	-	6
1923	22	40	1	3	-	-	2
1924	24	38	3	3	-	-	-
1925	24	39	3	2	-	-	-
1926	38	25	3	1	-	-	1
1927	39	24	3	1	-	-	1
1928	41	23	?	-	-	-	1
1929	63	22	9	?	-	-	?
1930	57	?	?	?	-	-	?
1931	49	?	?	?	1	-	?
1932	41	?	?	?	1	-	?
1933	50	?	?	?	-	-	?
1934	56	?	?	?	-	-	?
1935	57	?	?	?	-	-	?
1936	?	?	?	?	-	-	?
1937	?	?	?	?	-	-	?
1938	53	?	?	?	-	-	?
1945	59	39	-	-	-	1	1
1946	63	36	-	-	-	-	1
1947	68	?	?	?	-	-	?
1949	64	36	?	?	-	-	?

Year	Labour	Liberal	Conservative	Independent	Ratepayers
1950	64	0	36	0	0
1951	63	0	37	0	0
1952	67	0	33	0	0
1953	68	0	32	0	0
1954	70	0	30	0	0
1955	72	0	28	0	0
1956	72	0	28	0	0
1957	72	0	28	0	0
1958	72	0	28	0	0
1959	72	0	28	0	0
1960	67	0	32	0	1
1961	67	0	32	0	1
1962	67	0	32	0	1
1963	73	0	27	0	0
1964	73	0	27	0	0
1965	72	0	28	0	0
1966	72	0	28	0	0
1967	59	0	48	1	0
1968	52	0	56	0	0
1969	57	0	51	0	0
1970	63	1	44	0	0
1971	80	1	27	0	0
1972	84	1	23	0	0

Boundary changes took place for the 2004 election which reduced the number of seats by 3, leading to the whole council being elected in that year.

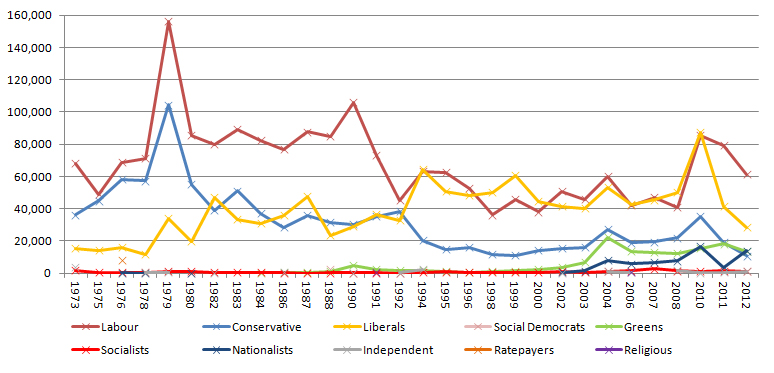
Popular vote numbers, 1973-2012

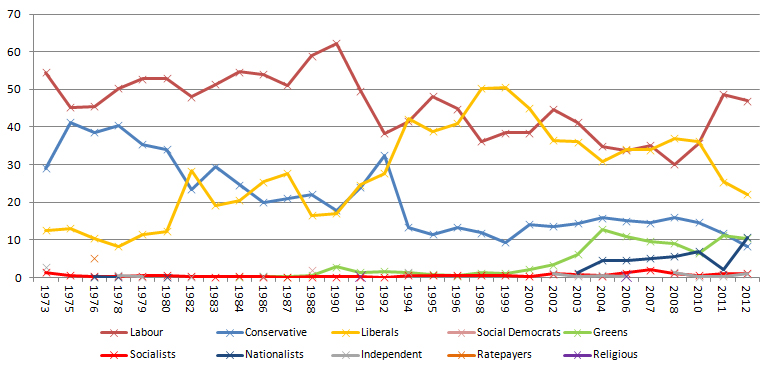
Popular vote share, 1973-2012

Year	Labour	Conservative	Liberal and SDP (before 1990); Liberal Democrat (after 1990)	Greens	Independent	UKIP	Reform UK
1973	69	18	3	0	0	0	0
1975	66	20	4	0	0	0	0
1976	63	22	5	0	0	0	0
1978	60	24	6	0	0	0	0
1979	62	22	6	0	0	0	0
1980	60	18	9	0	0	0	0
1982	60	18	9	0	0	0	0
1983	60	18	9	0	0	0	0
1984	61	17	9	0	0	0	0
1986	63	15	9	0	0	0	0
1987	65	13	9	0	0	0	0
1988	66	12	9	0	0	0	0
1990	69	10	7	0	0	0	0
1991	70	11	6	0	0	0	0
1992	67	11	9	0	0	0	0
1994	56	8	22	0	0	0	0
1995	58	4	25	0	0	0	0
1996	55	1	31	0	0	0	0
1998	50	1	36	0	0	0	0
1999	39	1	47	0	0	0	0
2000	37	1	49	0	1 (Liberal)	0	0
2002	43	2	42	0	0	0	0
2003	49	1	37	0	0	0	0
2004	44	2	37	1	0	0	0
2006	44	2	36	2	0	0	0
2007	41	1	39	2	1	0	0
2008	36	0	45	3	0	0	0
2010	39	0	42	2	1	0	0
2011	50	0	32	2	0	0	0
2012	60	0	22	2	0	0	0
2014	59	0	18	4	0	3	0
2015	59	0	17	4	0	4	0
2016	57	0	19	4	0	4	0
2018	53	0	22	6	0	3	0
2019	49	0	26	8	0	1	0
2021	41	1	29	13	0	0	0
2022	39	1	29	14	1	0	0
2023	39	1	29	14	1	0	0
2024	36	0	27	14	7	0	0
2026	25	0	22	20	4	0	13

== Borough result maps ==
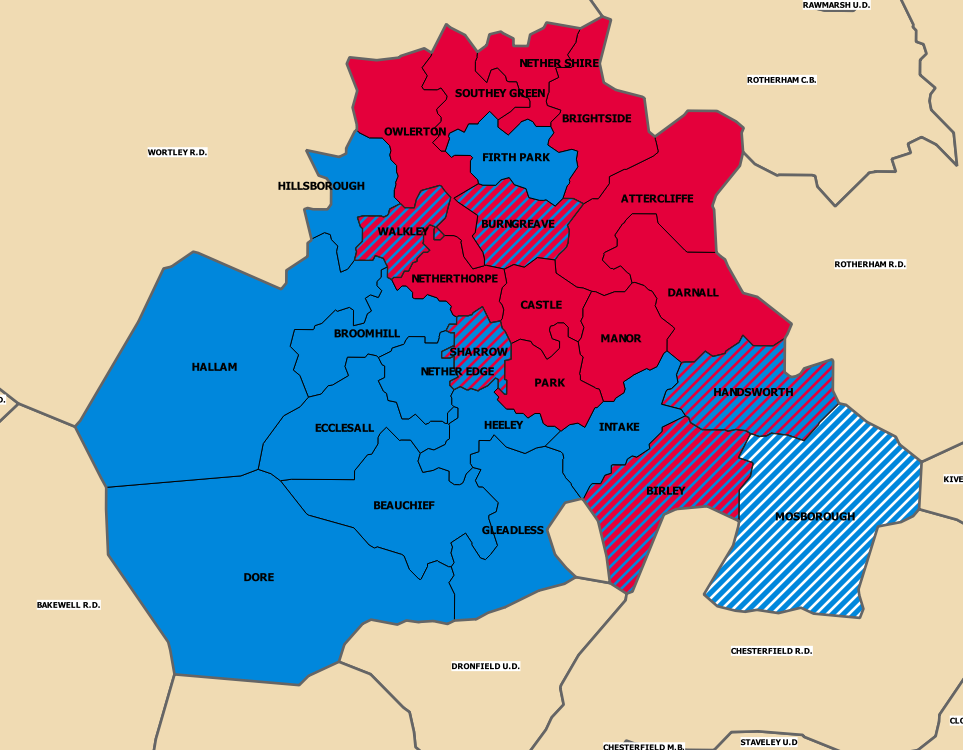
1967 results map

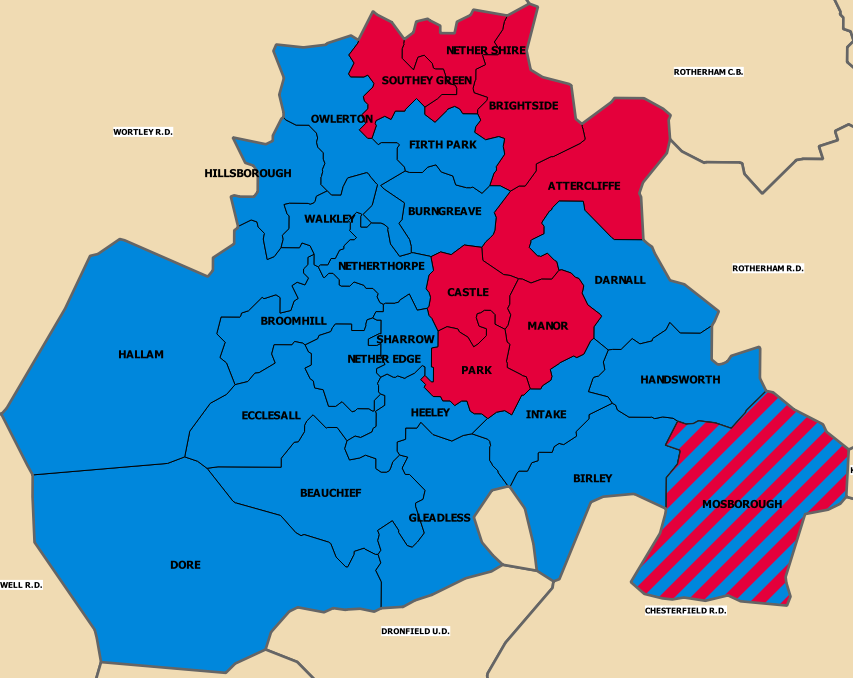
1968 results map

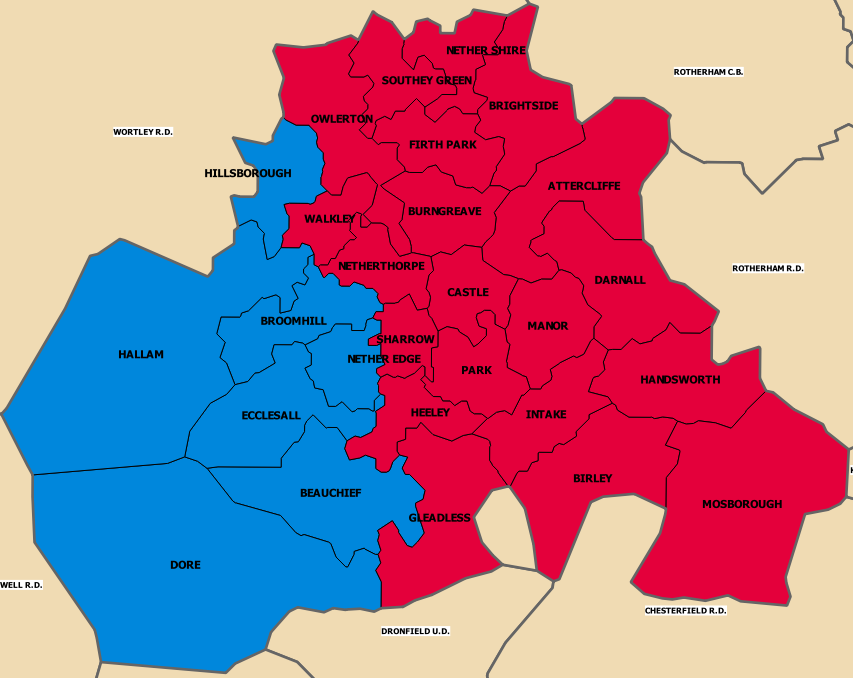
1970 results map

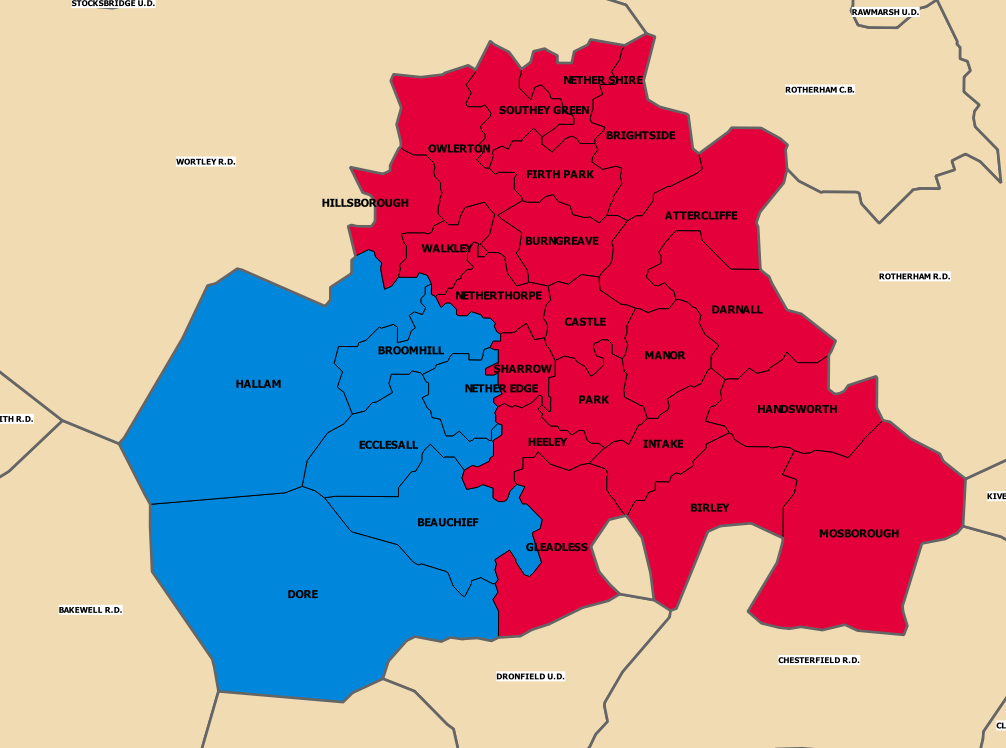
1971 results map

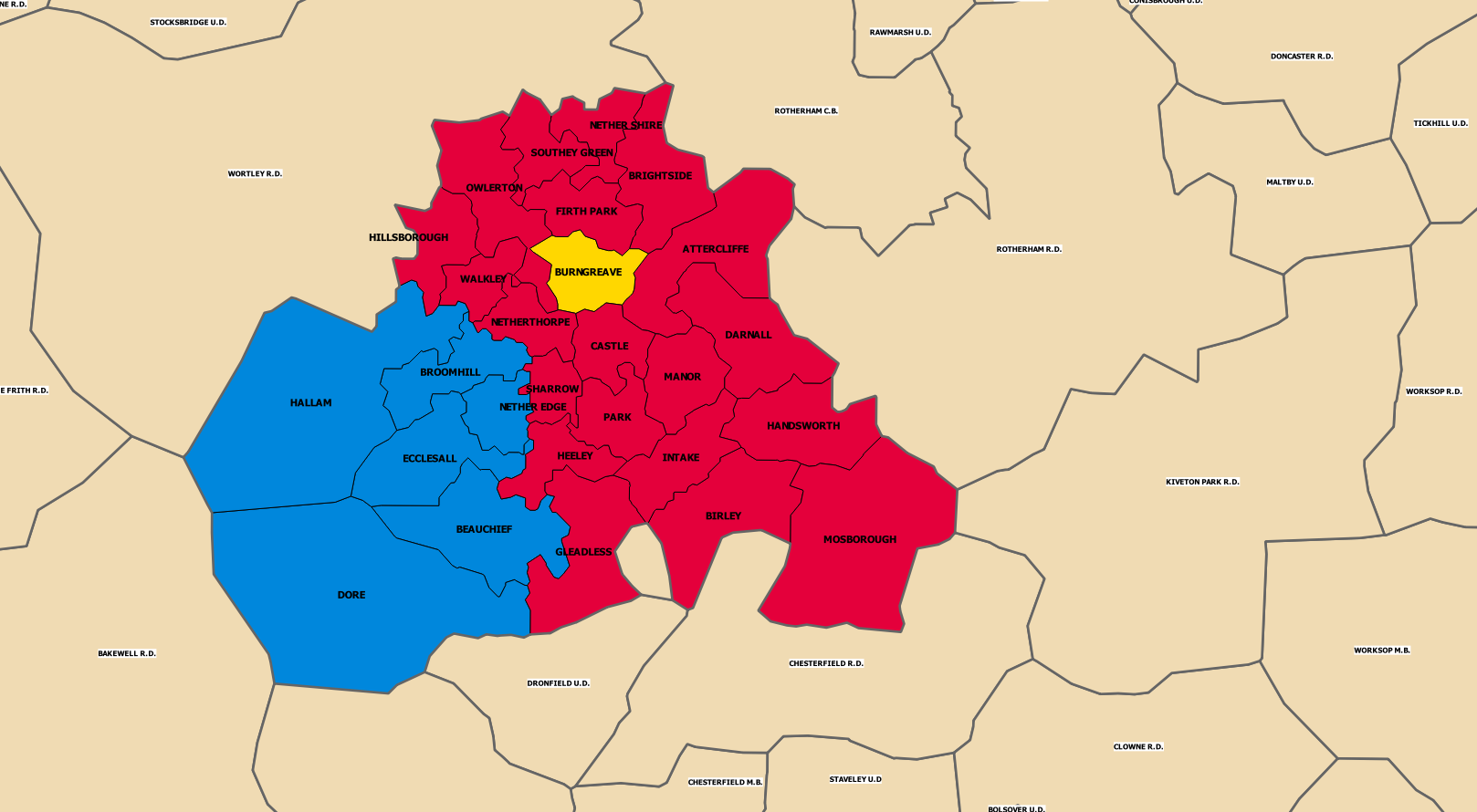
1972 results map

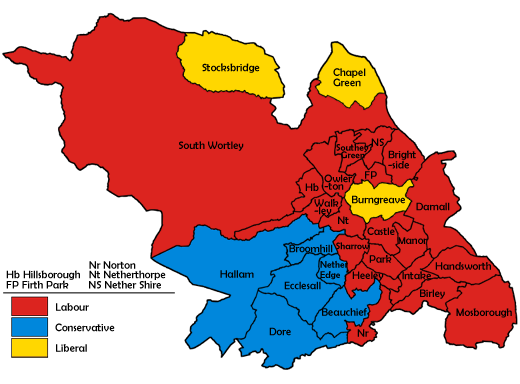
1980 results map

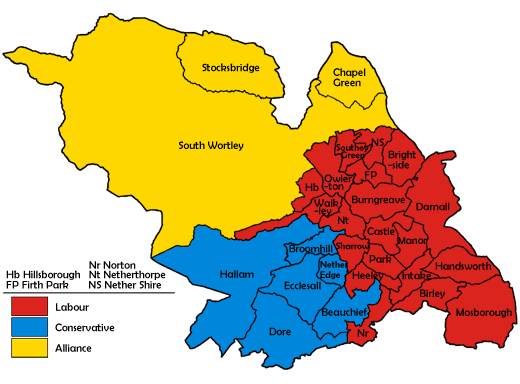
1982 results map

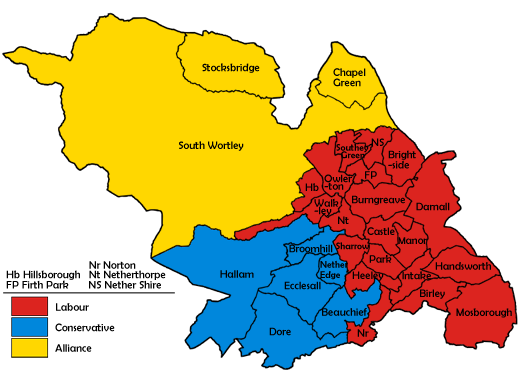
1983 results map

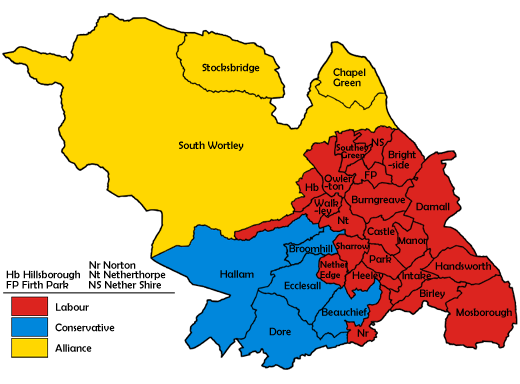
1984 results map

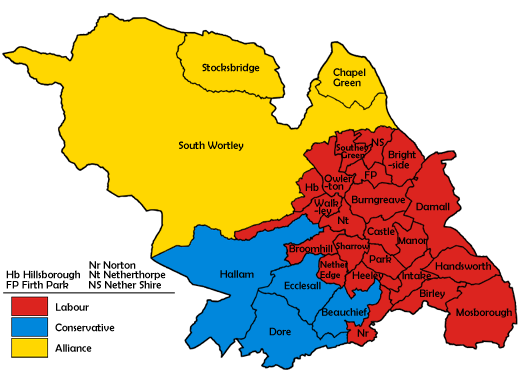
1986 results map

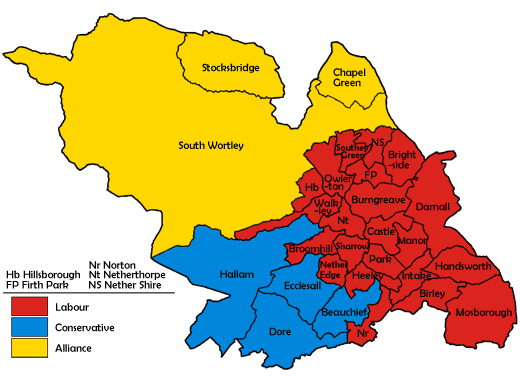
1987 results map

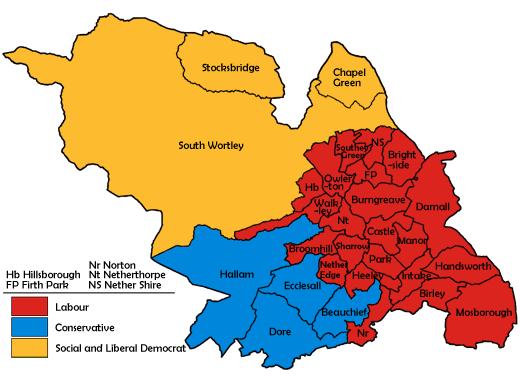
1988 results map

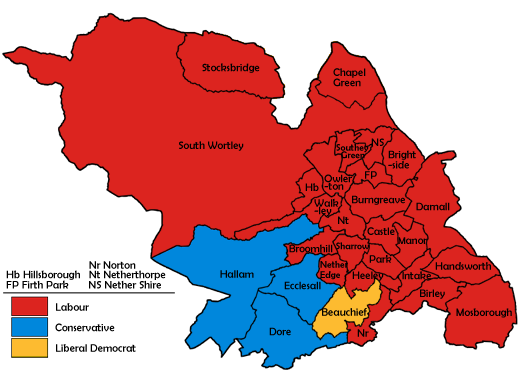
1990 results map

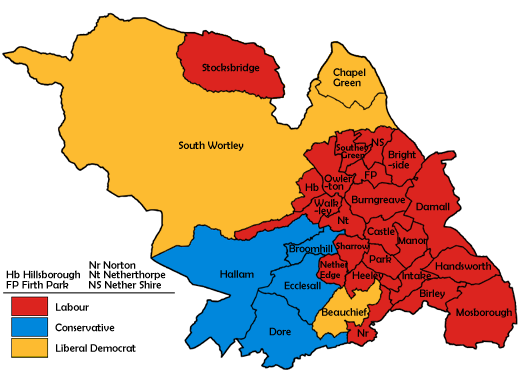
1991 results map

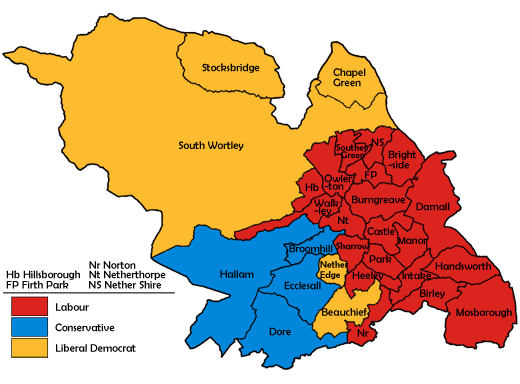
1992 results map

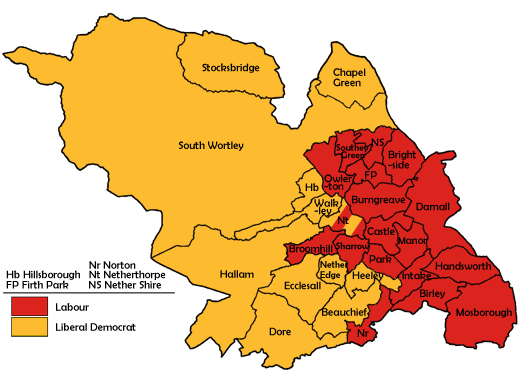
1994 results map

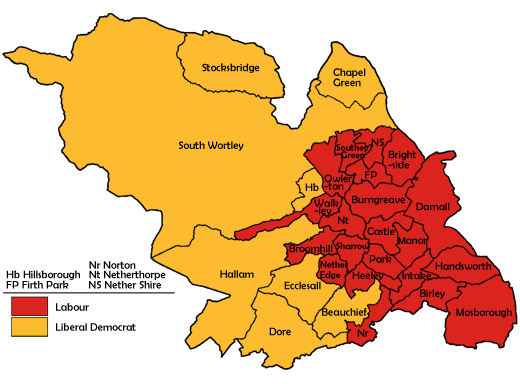
1995 results map

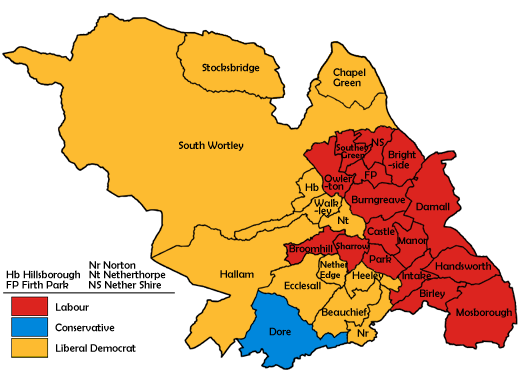
1996 results map

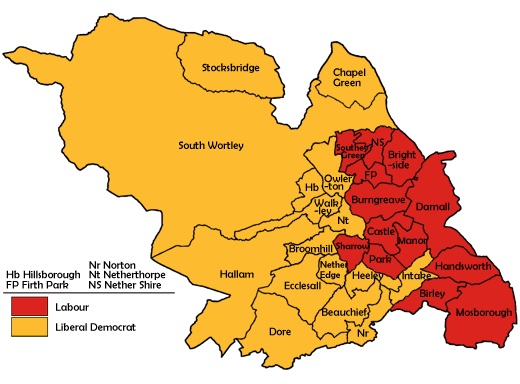
1998 results map

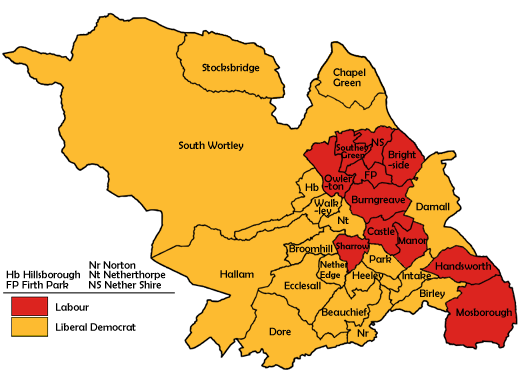
1999 results map

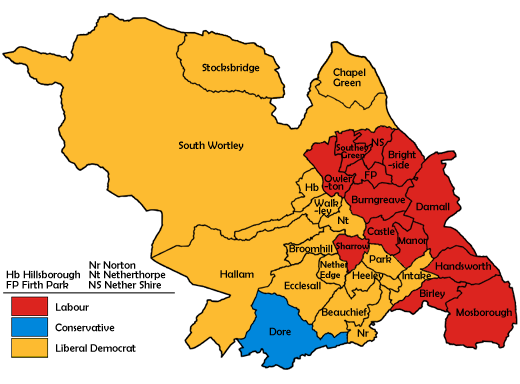
2000 results map

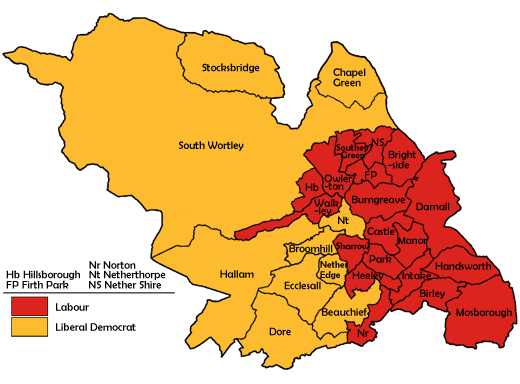
2002 results map

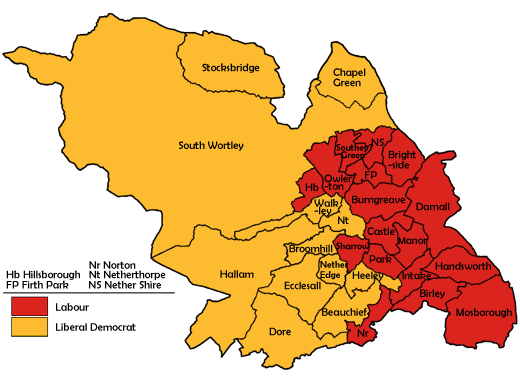
2003 results map

2004 results map

2006 results map

2007 results map

2008 results map

2010 results map

2011 results map

2012 results map

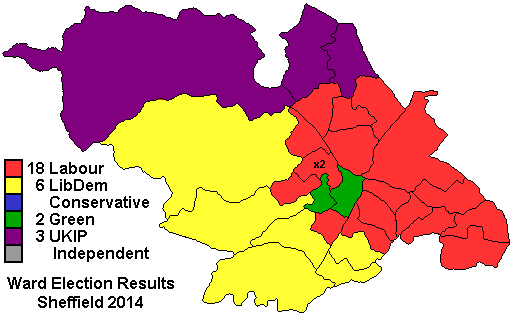
2014 results map

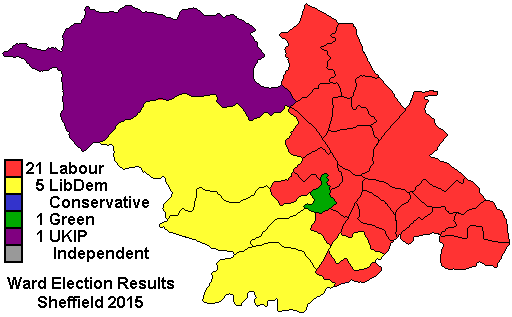
2015 results map

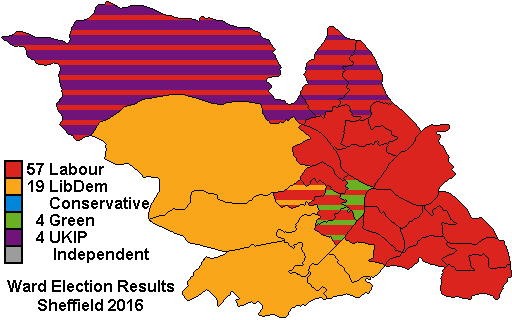
2016 results map

2018 results map

2019 results map

2021 results map

2022 results map

2023 results map

2024 results map

2026 results map

== By-election results ==
By-elections occur when seats become vacant between council elections. Below is a summary of recent by-elections; full by-election results can be found by clicking on the by-election name.

By-election	Date	Incumbent party	Winning party
Ecclesall by-election	28 January 1977	Conservative	Conservative
Nether Edge by-election	28 January 1977	Conservative	Conservative
Manor by-election	12 August 1977	Labour	Labour
Brightside by-election	8 October 1992	Labour	Liberal Democrats
Dore by-election	8 October 1992	Conservative	Conservative
Walkley by-election	26 November 1992	Labour	Liberal Democrats
Walkley by-election	14 January 1993	Liberal Democrats	Liberal Democrats
Park by-election	14 January 1999	Labour	Liberal Democrats
Chapel Green by-election	7 July 1999	Liberal Democrats	Liberal Democrats
Park by-election	19 October 2000	Labour	Labour
Southey Green by-election	19 October 2000	Labour	Labour
Birley by-election	5 May 2005	Labour	Labour
East Ecclesfield by-election	30 April 2009	Liberal Democrats	Liberal Democrats
Woodhouse by-election	26 August 2010	Labour	Labour
Manor Castle by-election	21 October 2010	Labour	Labour
Fulwood by-election	2 May 2013	Liberal Democrats	Liberal Democrats
Arbourthorne by-election	6 February 2014	Labour	Labour
Mosborough by-election	8 September 2016	Labour	Liberal Democrats
Southey by-election	4 May 2017	Labour	Labour
Nether Edge and Sharrow by-election	22 June 2017	Labour	Labour
Beighton by-election	12 October 2017	Labour	Labour
Firth Park by-election	16 September 2021	Labour	Labour
Stannington by-election	18 January 2024	Liberal Democrats	Liberal Democrats
Woodhouse by-election	28 November 2024	Labour	Liberal Democrats
Stocksbridge and Upper Don by-election	26 June 2025	Labour	Reform
Southey by-election	27 August 2026	Labour	Reform
Walkley by-election	17 September 2026	Green	Labour

== See also ==
- Sheffield City Council
