= 2026 Sheffield City Council election =

2026 English local government election

- 7 May 2026

30 out of 84 seats to Sheffield City Council (including 2 by-elections) 43 seats needed for a majority
	First party	Second party	Third party
Leader	Tom Hunt	Martin Smith	Angela Argenzio
Party	Labour	Liberal Democrats	Green
Leader's seat	Walkley (Defeated)	Dore & Totley	Broomhill & Sharrow Vale
Last election	36 seats, 39.8%	27 seats, 21.7%	14 seats, 22.0%
Seats before	35	27	14
Seats won	3	5	10
Seats after	25	22	20
Seat change	▼13	▼5	▲6
Popular vote	35,215	32,056	47,886
Percentage	20.2%	18.4%	27.5%
Swing	▼19.6%	▼3.3%	▲5.5%
	Fourth party	Fifth party
Leader		Dianne Hurst (Note: Spokesperson for the Sheffield Community Councillors Group.)
Party	Reform	Independent
Last election	0 seats, 0.4%	7 seats, 4.1%
Seats before	1	6 (Note: Of the 6 Independent councillors before the election, 4 sat in the Sheffield Community Councillors Group and 2 were non-aligned.)
Seats won	12	0
Seats after	13	4
Seat change	▲12	▼2
Popular vote	45,900	5,070
Percentage	26.4%	2.9%
Swing	▲26.0%	▼1.2%
- Winner of each seat at the 2026 Sheffield City Council election
Leader before election
Tom Hunt
Labour
No overall control (Note: Labour–Liberal Democrat–Green coalition.)
Leader after election
Fran Belbin
Labour
No overall control (Note: Labour–Green coalition.)

The 2026 Sheffield City Council election took place on Thursday 7 May 2026, alongside other local elections in the United Kingdom. One third of the 84 members of Sheffield City Council in South Yorkshire were elected.

Prior to the election, the council was under no overall control, being run by a coalition of Labour, the Liberal Democrats and the Green Party, led by Labour councillor Tom Hunt. At this election, the council remained under no overall control. Labour remained the largest party, but it lost seats, notably to the Greens and Reform UK. The incumbent leader, Tom Hunt, lost his seat. After the election, the Liberal Democrats decided to withdraw from the ruling coalition, leaving it as a Labour and Green coalition. Labour chose Fran Belbin as its new group leader, and she was formally appointed as the new leader of the council at the subsequent annual council meeting on 21 May 2026.

== Council composition ==
After 2024 election		Before 2026 election	
Party	Seats	Party	Seats
Labour	36	Labour	34
Liberal Democrats	27	Liberal Democrats	27
Green	14	Green	14
Reform	0	Reform	1
Independent	7 (Note: Denise Fox, Terry Fox, Dianne Hurst, and Garry Weatherall sit as part of the Sheffield Community Councillors Group.)	Independent	6
Vacant	N/A	Vacant	2

Changes 2024–2026:

- September 2024: Paul Wood (Independent, elected as Labour) dies – by-election held November 2024
- November 2024: Willis Marshall (Liberal Democrats) nominally gains by-election from Labour
- May 2025:
  - Julie Grocutt (Independent, elected as Labour) resigns – by-election held June 2025
  - Willis Marshall (Liberal Democrats) suspended from party
- June 2025: John Booker (Reform) nominally gains by-election from Labour
- February 2026: Willis Marshall (Independent) regains whip
- March 2026:
  - Ann Woolhouse (Liberal Democrats) resigns – seat left vacant until 2026 election
  - Nikki Belfield (Labour) resigns – seat left vacant until 2026 election
- April 2026: Gareth Slater (Labour) leaves party to sit as an independent

== Summary ==
=== Background ===
Sheffield City Council was created in 1974 as a metropolitan borough. Labour saw early success, controlling the council from its creation until 1999 when the Liberal Democrats took control. This lasted until 2002, when the council fell into no overall control. Labour regained the council in 2004, but the Liberal Democrats formed their second majority administration in 2008.

Labour have been the largest party on the council since 2011. However, following a loss of eight seats in 2021, the party have been unable to form a majority administration. Labour initially formed a coalition with the Green Party; from 2022 onwards, though, both the Greens and the Liberal Democrats have joined with Labour to form a coalition. In 2023, eight ex-Labour councillors formed an independent group, known as the Sheffield Community Councillors Group, thus forming the principal opposition on the council. Four councillors remain a part of this group.

The seats up for election this year were last contested in 2022. In that election, Labour won 15 seats (down 1), the Liberal Democrats won 9 seats (steady), and the Greens won 4 seats (up 1).

=== Election result ===
2026 Sheffield City Council election
Party	This election				Full council			This election		
Party	Candidates	Seats	Net	Seats %	Other	Total	Total %	Votes	Votes %	+/−
Labour		3	▼13	10.0	22	25	29.8	33,490	20.2	-19.1
Liberal Democrats		5	▼5	16.7	17	22	26.2	30,262	18.2	-3.7
Green		10	▲6	33.3	10	20	23.8	46,909	28.3	+6.2
Reform		12	▲12	40.0	1	13	15.5	42,649	25.7	+25.3
Independent		0	0	0.0	4	4	4.8	5,070	3.1	-1.1
Conservative		0	Steady	0.0	0	0	0.0	6,526	3.9	-5.5
TUSC		0	Steady	0.0	0	0	0.0	942	0.6	-1.6
UKIP		0	0	0.0	0	0	0.0	47	0.0	N/A

== Incumbents ==
Ward	Incumbent councillor	Party	Re-standing
Beauchief & Greenhill	Simon Clement-Jones	Liberal Democrats	Yes
Beighton	Kurtis Crossthorn	Liberal Democrats	Yes
Birley	Karen McGowan	Labour	Yes
Broomhill & Sharrow Vale	Maleiki Haybe	Green	Yes
Burngreave	Mark Jones	Labour	No
City	Martin Phipps	Green	No
Crookes & Crosspool	Minesh Parekh	Labour Co-op	Yes
Darnall	Zahira Naz	Labour	Yes
Dore & Totley	Martin Smith	Liberal Democrats	Yes
East Ecclesfield	Craig Gamble-Pugh	Labour Co-op	Yes
Ecclesall	Shaffaq Mohammed	Liberal Democrats	No
Firth Park	Fran Belbin (Note: Elected at the 2024 Firth Park by-election.)	Labour Co-op	Yes
Fulwood	Cliff Woodcraft	Liberal Democrats	Yes
Gleadless Valley	Marieanne Elliot	Green	Yes
Graves Park	Steve Ayris	Liberal Democrats	Yes
Hillsborough	Henry Nottage	Green	No
Manor Castle	Terry Fox (Note: Originally elected as Labour, but left the party to sit as an independent.)	Independent	No
Mosborough	Gail Smith	Liberal Democrats	Yes
Nether Edge & Sharrow	Nighat Basharat	Labour	Yes
Park & Arbourthorne	Nabeela Mowlana	Labour Co-op	Yes
Richmond	Mike Drabble	Labour	No
Shiregreen & Brightside	Garry Weatherall	Independent	Yes
Southey	Jayne Dunn	Labour	Yes
Stannington	William Sapwell (Note: Elected at the 2024 Stannington by-election.)	Liberal Democrats	Yes
Stocksbridge & Upper Don	Janet Ridler	Labour	Yes
Walkley	Tom Hunt	Labour	Yes
West Ecclesfield	Mike Levery	Liberal Democrats	Yes
Woodhouse	Willis Marshall (Note: Originally elected at the 2024 Woodhouse by-election as a Liberal Democrat, but was suspended from the party in May 2025 before regaining the whip in February 2026.)	Liberal Democrats	Yes

== Ward results ==
=== Beauchief & Greenhill ===
Beauchief & Greenhill
Party	Candidate	Votes	%	±%
Liberal Democrats	Simon Clement-Jones*	1,819	31.7	−11.0
Reform	Amanda Gaffney	1,674	29.1	N/A
Green	Jonathan Bagley	1,099	19.1	+6.4
Labour	Hafeas Rehman	871	15.2	−16.7
Conservative	Michelle Astle	249	4.3	−4.4
TUSC	Daniel Smith	31	0.5	−1.3
Majority		145	2.6	−8.2
Turnout		5,743	41.8	+7.7
Registered electors		13,770		
Liberal Democrats hold				

=== Beighton ===
By-election due to the resignation of conucillor Ann Woolhouse.

Beighton (2 seats due to by-election)
Party	Candidate	Votes	%	±%
Reform	Laurence Hayward	2,197	43.0	N/A
Reform	Stuart Wallace	1,989	38.9	N/A
Liberal Democrats	Amanda Adlington	1,701	33.3	−4.1
Liberal Democrats	Kurtis Crossthorn*	1,636	32.0	−5.4
Labour	Wayne Rhodes	683	13.4	−23.9
Labour Co-op	Bridget Kelly	655	12.8	−24.5
Green	Stewart Kemp	436	8.5	+1.5
Green	Kim Perry	371	7.3	+0.3
Conservative	Shirley Clayton	274	5.4	−10.6
Conservative	Suzanne Davison	159	3.1	−12.9
Independent	Craig Myers	87	1.7	N/A
TUSC	Alexander Brown	29	0.6	−1.7
Turnout		5,280	39.8	+12.8
Registered electors		13,256		
Reform gain from Liberal Democrats				
Reform gain from Liberal Democrats				

=== Birley ===
Birley
Party	Candidate	Votes	%	±%
Reform	Luke Goddard	2,153	44.3	N/A
Labour	Karen McGowan*	1,292	26.6	−21.0
Green	Alan Yearsley	597	12.3	+2.6
Independent	David Cronshaw	368	7.6	−12.7
Liberal Democrats	Charles Edwardson	218	4.5	−4.5
Conservative	Daniel Gage	218	4.5	−7.3
TUSC	Andrea Ugolini	16	0.3	−1.2
Majority		861	17.7	N/A
Turnout		4,862	38.8	+13.2
Registered electors		12,546		
Reform gain from Labour				

=== Broomhill & Sharrow Vale ===
Broomhill & Sharrow Vale
Party	Candidate	Votes	%	±%
Green	Maleiki Haybe*	4,038	64.8	+13.8
Labour	Louise Cooper	1,175	18.9	−14.7
Liberal Democrats	Fiona Carr	405	6.5	+0.4
Reform	Andrew Grafton	401	6.4	N/A
Conservative	Charles Hughes	170	2.7	−2.1
TUSC	John Bunn	40	0.6	−1.8
Majority		2,863	45.9	+28.5
Turnout		6,229	45.7	+8.8
Registered electors		13,682		
Green hold		Swing	▲14.3	

=== Burngreave ===
Burngreave
Party	Candidate	Votes	%	±%
Green	Mustafa Ahmed	1,816	34.8	+12.2
Labour Co-op	Hannah Cawley	1,138	21.8	−23.3
Independent	Osman Rafiq	754	14.5	N/A
Independent	Abdullah Okud	616	11.8	N/A
Reform	Neil Danford	591	11.3	N/A
Conservative	Andrew Brooker	149	2.9	−3.2
Liberal Democrats	James Ellwood	106	2.0	−5.6
Independent	Khalil Al-Asad	42	0.8	N/A
Majority		678	13.0	N/A
Turnout		5,238	34.8	+7.7
Registered electors		15,049		
Green gain from Labour		Swing	▲17.8	

=== City ===
City
Party	Candidate	Votes	%	±%
Green	Maia Salman-Lord	2,524	71.1	+19.7
Labour	Terezia Rostas	434	12.2	−21.8
Reform	Lee Rooker	239	6.7	N/A
Liberal Democrats	Shelley Cockayne	182	5.1	−0.2
Conservative	Ashish Bhandari	155	4.4	−1.7
TUSC	Madeline Rooney	15	0.4	−2.8
Majority		2,090	68.9	+20.8
Turnout		3,554	27.0	+6.2
Registered electors		13,036		
Green hold		Swing	▲20.8	

=== Crookes & Crosspool ===
Crookes & Crosspool (1 seat)
Party	Candidate	Votes	%	±%
Labour Co-op	Minesh Parekh	2,656	35.0	−13.3
Green	Dylan Lewis-Creser	2,083	27.5	+13.3
Liberal Democrats	Jordan Barry	1,794	23.6	−8.3
Reform	Ricia Ward	846	11.2	N/A
Conservative	Aliou Diallo	159	2.1	−2.4
TUSC	Alasdair Hadrian Cook	48	0.6	−0.5
Majority		573	7.5	
Turnout		7,586	59.33	+8.33
Labour hold		Swing		

=== Darnall ===
Darnall (1 seat)
Party	Candidate	Votes	%	±%
Labour	Zahira Naz	1,289	25.3	−1.7
Independent	Asif Ahmed	1,244	24.4	N/A
Reform	Timothy Goddard	996	19.5	N/A
Independent	Misbah Chowdhury	786	15.4	N/A
Green	Joydu Al Mahfuz	509	10.0	+3.1
Liberal Democrats	Thomas Huggan	143	2.8	−5.9
Conservative	Margaret Pigott	129	2.5	−2.1
Majority		55	0.9	
Turnout		5096	36.62	+3.52
Labour hold		Swing		

=== Dore & Totley ===
Dore & Totley (1 seat)
Party	Candidate	Votes	%	±%
Liberal Democrats	Martin Richard Smith	3,142	39.1	−12.2
Reform	Paul Jakeman	1,874	23.3	N/A
Green	Gill Black	1,233	15.3	+2.9
Labour Co-op	Nicola Smith	1,135	14.1	−7.6
Conservative	Zoe Michelle Steane	618	7.7	−6.0
TUSC	Isaac Joseph Harry Graves	33	0.4	−0.5
Majority		1268	15.8	
Turnout		8035	54.5	+10.5
Liberal Democrats hold		Swing		

=== East Ecclesfield ===
East Ecclesfield (1 seat)
Party	Candidate	Votes	%	±%
Reform	Sean Maloney	2,365	38.7	N/A
Liberal Democrats	Susan Davidson	1,850	30.3	−12.0
Labour Co-op	Craig Gamble Pugh	1,203	19.7	−18.6
Green	Rosie Trevillion	442	7.2	+1.1
Conservative	Kevin Mahoney	227	3.7	−7.0
TUSC	Colin Michael Wray	21	0.3	−1.9
Majority		515	8.4	N/A
Turnout		6,108	44.16	+11.86
Reform gain from Labour		Swing		

=== Ecclesall ===
Ecclesall
Party	Candidate	Votes	%	±%
Green	Tessa Louise Lupton	4,328	44.9	▲7.2
Liberal Democrats	Michael Edward Brown	3,000	31.1	▼1.9
Labour	Rory Joseph Gilmore	1,228	12.7	▼10.3
Reform	John Andrew Horton	721	7.5	N/A
Conservative	Gordon Ronald Millward	317	3.3	▼2.1
TUSC	Noah Thomas Eden	39	0.4	▼0.5
Majority		1,328	13.8	▲9.1
Turnout		9,633	60.3	▲7.5
Registered electors		15,995		
Green gain from Liberal Democrats		Swing	+4.6	

=== Firth Park ===
By-election due to the resignation of councillor Nikki Belfield.

Firth Park (2 seats)
Party	Candidate	Votes	%	±%
Reform	Robert Hanson	1,442	38.2	N/A
Labour Co-op	Fran Belbin	1,352	35.9	−23.7
Reform	Graeme Boyd Waddicar	1,262	33.5	N/A
Labour Co-op	Sarah Marie Hill	1,070	28.4	−31.9
Green	Mike Harrison	793	21.0	+4.5
Green	Eamonn Charles Ward	606	16.1	+1.8
Liberal Democrats	Victoria Margaret Bowden	252	6.7	−1.6
Independent	Omer Abdulqader	244	6.5	N/A
Conservative	Daniel Jonathon Fielding	194	5.1	−6.5
Liberal Democrats	Thomas Sturgess	158	4.2	−3.8
Conservative	David Tetenji	125	3.3	−3.6
TUSC	Luke Jonathan Elliott Brownbill	42	1.1	−5.9
Turnout		4,133	28.67	+7.47
Reform gain from Labour Co-op		Swing		
Labour Co-op hold		Swing		

=== Fulwood ===
Fulwood (1 seat)
Party	Candidate	Votes	%	±%
Liberal Democrats	Cliff Woodcraft	3,053	37.6	−10.6
Green	John Ronan	2,952	36.3	+20.4
Reform	Andy Telford	906	11.2	N/A
Labour Co-op	Thomas Evans	830	10.2	−16.1
Conservative	Thomas Wilson	362	4.5	−3.8
TUSC	Ellie Axe	21	0.3	−1.0
Majority		101	1.4	
Turnout		8124	58.42	+11.62
Liberal Democrats hold		Swing		

=== Gleadless Valley ===
Gleadless Valley (1 seat)
Party	Candidate	Votes	%	±%
Green	Marieanne Elliot	3,517	60.7	▲8.5
Reform	Andy Rayner	1,077	18.6	N/A
Labour Co-op	Bob Pemberton	763	13.2	▼20.8
Liberal Democrats	John Dryden	336	5.8	▲0.8
TUSC	Simon John Jenkins	62	1.1	▼1.7
Conservative	Jennifer Karen Grant	43	0.7	▼5.3
Majority		2440	42.1	
Turnout		5798	43.78	▲8.48
Green hold		Swing		

=== Graves Park ===
Graves Park (1 seat)
Party	Candidate	Votes	%	±%
Green	Tom Atkin-Withers	2,254	32.5	▲13.1
Liberal Democrats	Steve Ayris	1,807	26.0	▼8.5
Reform	Robert David White	1,464	21.1	N/A
Labour	Julia Catherine Brown	1,168	16.8	▼19.6
Conservative	Trevor Henry Grant	212	3.1	▼4.3
TUSC	David Pascoe Ellis	40	0.6	▼1.7
Majority		447	6.5	N/A
Turnout		6,945	51.39	▲11.19
Green gain from Liberal Democrats		Swing		

=== Hillsborough ===
Hillsborough (1 seat)
Party	Candidate	Votes	%	±%
Green	Richard Tinsley	3,445	50.5	▼0.8
Reform	Mike Bell	1,802	26.4	N/A
Labour	Andrew Wild	1,045	15.3	▼17.9
Liberal Democrats	Christopher Alan Lynch	231	3.4	▼0.6
Conservative	Eve Millward	199	2.9	▼3.9
Independent	Mark Harrop	68	1.0	N/A
TUSC	Joseph Lewis Hibbert	34	0.5	▼1.7
Majority		1643	24.1	N/A
Turnout		6,482	46.51	▲10.31
Green hold		Swing		

=== Manor Castle ===
Manor Castle (1 seat)
Party	Candidate	Votes	%	±%
Green	Margaret Ruth Abbey	2,012	42.5	▲24.1
Reform	Seun Ajao	1,241	26.2	N/A
Labour	Michael Chilton	1,080	22.8	▼34.8
Conservative	Dylan Turner	177	3.7	▼5.7
Liberal Democrats	Stephanie Jane Kenning	149	3.1	▼2.1
Independent	Peter Joseph Reilly	51	1.1	N/A
TUSC	Alistair Tice	27	0.6	▼3.3
Majority		771	16.3	N/A
Turnout		4,737	30.74	▲8.74
Green gain from Labour		Swing		

=== Mosborough ===
Mosborough (1 seat)
Party	Candidate	Votes	%	±%
Reform	Joel McGuigan	2,114	40.5	N/A
Liberal Democrats	Gail Smith	1,450	27.8	−8.9
Labour	Jason Holyhead	836	16.0	−33.0
Green	Julie White	444	8.5	+4.9
Conservative	Patricia Jean Barnsley	269	5.2	−4.8
Independent	Ronald Corbett	74	1.4	N/A
TUSC	Michael John Hudgell	29	0.6	−0.1
Majority		664	22.7	N/A
Turnout		5,220	38.93	+7.73
Reform gain from Liberal Democrats		Swing		

=== Nether Edge & Sharrow ===
Nether Edge & Sharrow (1 seat)
Party	Candidate	Votes	%	±%
Green	Lynsey Angell	3,770	50.5	▲9.7
Labour	Nighat Basharat	2,695	36.1	▼3.0
Reform	Sean Patrick Pearce	441	5.9	N/A
Liberal Democrats	Joe Yeardley	319	4.3	▼3.4
Conservative	Joanne Mary Lowe	192	2.6	▼1.3
TUSC	Tilde Resare	54	0.7	▼1.9
Majority		1,075	14.4	N/A
Turnout		7,471	48.6	▲5.7
Green gain from Labour		Swing	6.35	

=== Park & Arbourthorne ===
Park & Arbourthorne (1 seat)
Party	Candidate	Votes	%	±%
Reform	Matt Smith	1,740	38.0	N/A
Labour Co-op	Nabeela Mowlana	1,287	28.1	−22.7
Green	Billie Dawn Turner	1,009	22.0	+6.6
Conservative	Brian Stringfellow	210	4.6	−10.2
Liberal Democrats	Ann Patricia Kingdom	193	4.2	−4.4
Independent	Dwaine Craven	89	1.9	N/A
TUSC	Jack Jeffery	52	1.1	−3.7
Majority		453	9.9	N/A
Turnout		4,580	34.73	+10.33
Reform gain from Labour		Swing		

=== Richmond ===
Richmond (1 seat)
Party	Candidate	Votes	%	±%
Reform	Jack Byrom	2,472	50.5	+34.9
Labour Co-op	Beth Cheshire	1,107	22.6	−31.1
Green	Luke William Hunt	710	14.5	+4.0
Conservative	Pansy Plester	256	5.2	−7.3
Liberal Democrats	Adil Shaffaq Mohammed	168	3.4	−0.5
Independent	Joe Greatorex	107	2.2	N/A
UKIP	Jack Hurst	47	1.0	N/A
TUSC	Hollie Charlotte Buisson	27	0.6	−3.3
Majority		1365	27.9	N/A
Turnout		4,909	35.94	+12.44
Reform gain from Labour		Swing		

=== Shiregreen & Brightside ===
Shiregreen & Brightside (1 seat)
Party	Candidate	Votes	%	±%
Reform	Mick Lee	1,671	42.4	N/A
Labour Co-op	Josiah Lenton	951	24.1	−30.4
Green	Joel Gilbert	707	17.9	+4.3
Conservative	Lewis Lennard Henrey Malcolm Mills	192	4.9	−10.4
Liberal Democrats	Rachel Esther Barker	192	4.9	−1.4
Independent	Josh Darling	148	3.8	N/A
Independent	Garry David Weatherall	55	1.4	N/A
TUSC	Rebecca Fryer	25	0.6	−2.5
Majority		720	18.1	N/A
Turnout		3,953	28.93	+8.03
Reform gain from Labour		Swing		

=== Southey ===
Southey (1 seat)
Party	Candidate	Votes	%	±%
Reform	Yvonne Sykes	2,157	49.9	N/A
Labour Co-op	Jayne Dunn	1,059	24.5	−27.9
Green	Tuss Ramzan	557	12.9	−0.8
Conservative	Andrew Mark Smith	206	4.8	−6.8
Liberal Democrats	Kevin Grum	204	4.7	−2.4
Independent	Joseph Clark	111	2.6	N/A
TUSC	Harry John Lomas	26	0.6	−3.0
Majority		1098	25.4	N/A
Turnout		4,325	30.42	+10.72
Reform gain from Labour Co-op		Swing		

=== Stannington ===
Stannington (1 seat)
Party	Candidate	Votes	%	±%
Liberal Democrats	Will Sapwell	2,400	33.8	−6.4
Reform	Ian Oxley	2,266	31.9	N/A
Green	Maz Rowan Hamilton	1,089	15.3	+1.1
Labour Co-op	Lewis William Blake Dagnall	971	13.7	−18.9
Conservative	Matthew James Langham	301	4.2	−6.5
Independent	Cameron James Luke Mannion	48	0.7	N/A
TUSC	George Arthur Rollason	23	0.3	−2.0
Majority		134	1.9	
Turnout		7098	49.12	+14.7
Liberal Democrats hold		Swing		

=== Stocksbridge & Upper Don ===
Stocksbridge & Upper Don (1 seat)
Party	Candidate	Votes	%	±%
Reform	John Hesketh	2,554	37.3	N/A
Liberal Democrats	Stuart Andrew Shepherd	2,208	32.3	+24.1
Labour	Janet Hilary Ridler	1,022	14.9	−34.7
Green	David Willington	638	9.3	−3.2
Conservative	Owen Cooper	382	5.6	−22.1
TUSC	Claire Suzanne Wraith	35	0.5	−1.5
Majority		346	5.0	N/A
Turnout		6854	45.51	+11.81
Reform gain from Labour		Swing		

=== Walkley ===
Walkley (1 seat)
Party	Candidate	Votes	%	±%
Green	Andy Davies	2,794	40.1	▲8.0
Labour	Tom Hunt	2,721	39.0	▼11.2
Reform	Kim Vivien Hanson	980	14.1	N/A
Liberal Democrats	Alex Purvis	194	2.8	▼3.0
Conservative	Michael Lawrence Ginn	146	2.1	▼3.2
Independent	Harry Crawley	70	1.0	N/A
TUSC	Isabelle Amy France	69	1.0	▼2.0
Majority		73	1.1	N/A
Turnout		6995	46.13	▲8.63
Green gain from Labour		Swing		

=== West Ecclesfield ===
West Ecclesfield (1 seat)
Party	Candidate	Votes	%	±%
Liberal Democrats	Mike Levery	2,295	38.9	−1.5
Reform	David Ogle	2,278	38.6	N/A
Labour	Alexander Stuart Parker	609	10.3	−28.2
Green	Kathy Aston	435	7.4	+0.4
Conservative	Matt Dixon	254	4.3	−7.0
TUSC	Solomon David Wells-Ashmore	30	0.5	−2.2
Majority		17	0.3	
Turnout		5916	44	+13.2
Liberal Democrats hold		Swing		

=== Woodhouse ===
Woodhouse (1 seat)
Party	Candidate	Votes	%	±%
Reform	Nathaniel Menday	1,987	44.6	N/A
Labour Co-op	Danny Alan Allsebrook	890	20.0	−37.8
Green	Hannah Kate Nicklin	678	15.2	+5.3
Liberal Democrats	Willis James Marshall	451	10.1	+3.9
Conservative	Steven Winstone	266	6.0	−8.5
Independent	Dorne Carr	108	2.4	N/A
TUSC	Joshua Andrew Crapper	74	1.7	−1.1
Majority		1097	24.6	N/A
Turnout		4468	35.32	+10.72
Reform gain from Labour		Swing		

== Post-election changes ==
=== By-elections ===
==== Southey ====
Southey by-election: 27 August 2026 Resignation of Gareth Slater (Independent, elected as Labour)
Party	Candidate	Votes	%	±%
Reform	Paul Jakeman	1,133	50.6	+0.6
Labour	Jayne Dunn	836	37.3	+12.8
Green	Daniel Moy	146	6.5	−6.4
Conservative	Daniel Gage	69	3.1	−1.7
Liberal Democrats	Oliver George	56	2.5	−2.2
Majority		297	13.2	−12.2
Rejected ballots		3	0.1	
Turnout		2,243	15.6	−14.8
Registered electors		14,348		
Reform gain from Labour		Swing		

==== Walkley ====
Walkley by-election: 17 September 2026 Resignation of Andy Davies (Green)
Party	Candidate	Votes	%	±%
Labour	Hannah Cawley	2,315	53.4	+14.4
Green	Seb Van Bilsen Irias	1249	28.8	−11.2
Reform	Andrew Telford	541	12.5	−1.6
Liberal Democrats	Alex Purvis	112	2.6	−0.2
Conservative	Sonny Ullah	59	1.4	−0.7
TUSC	Isabelle France	56	1.3	+0.3
Majority		1066	24.6	+23.5
Turnout		4340	28.2	−17.9
Registered electors		15,390		
Labour gain from Green		Swing		
