= 2024 Sheffield City Council election =

Local election in Sheffield, England

- 2 May 2024

29 out of 84 seats to Sheffield City Council 43 seats needed for a majority
	First party	Second party	Third party
Leader	Tom Hunt	Shaffaq Mohammed	Douglas Johnson
Party	Labour	Liberal Democrats	Green
Last election	39 seats, 39.6%	29 seats, 26.2%	14 seats, 19.4%
Seats before	30	29	14
Seats won	15	7	6
Seats after	36	27	14
Seat change	▲5	▼2	Steady
Popular vote	51,574	28,106	28,561
Percentage	39.8%	21.7%	22.0%
Swing	▲0.2%	▼4.5%	▲2.6%
	Fourth party	Fifth party
Leader		Lewis Chinchen
Party	Independent	Conservative
Last election	1 seat, 0.0%	1 seat, 10.8%
Seats before	9	1
Seats won	1	0
Seats after	7	0
Seat change	▼2	▼1
Popular vote	5,336	12,064
Percentage	4.1%	9.3%
Swing	▲3.8%	▼1.5%
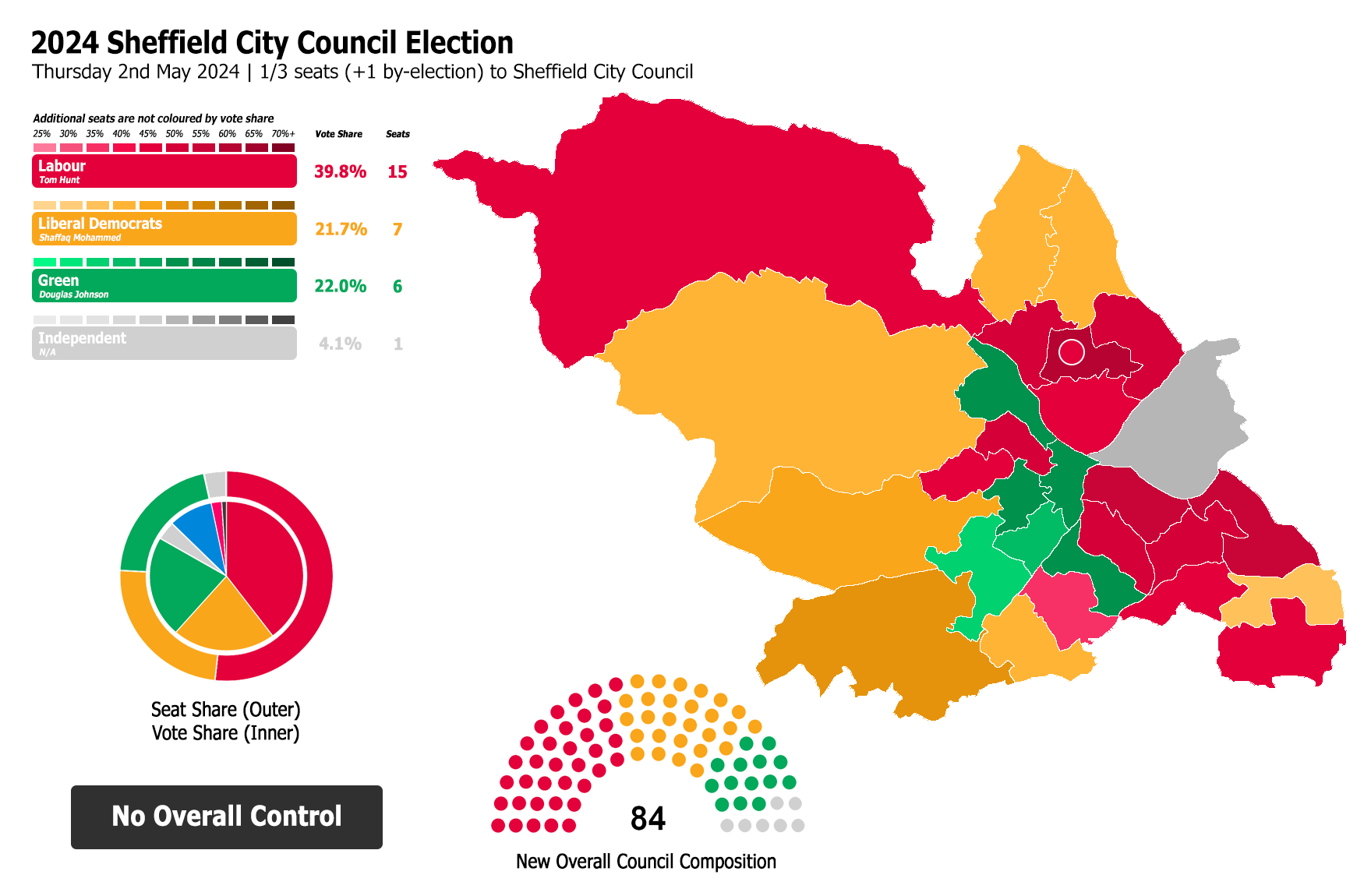
- Winner of each seat at the 2024 Sheffield City Council election
Leader before election
Tom Hunt
Labour
No overall control
Leader after election
Tom Hunt
Labour
No overall control

The 2024 Sheffield City Council election took place on Thursday 2 May 2024, alongside the other local elections in the United Kingdom being held on the same day. There were 29 of the 84 members of Sheffield City Council in South Yorkshire up for election, being the usual third of the council plus a by-election in Firth Park ward. The council remained under no overall control.

== Background ==
Sheffield is a typically strong council for the Labour Party. Labour governed the council as a majority from its creation in 1974 until 1999, when the Liberal Democrats won their first majority on the council. Labour regained their majority in 2003 after a brief period of no overall control, but lost their majority in 2007. The Liberal Democrats governed again in 2008, but Labour won a majority in 2011. They maintained control of the council until 2021, after which they formed a coalition with the Green Party. In the previous election, Labour won 14 seats with 39.6% of the vote, the Liberal Democrats won 11 with 26.2%, and the Green Party won 4 with 19.4%. Following the election, Labour formed a coalition with the Liberal Democrats and Green Party.

The seats up for election in 2024 were last contested in 2021; because of the delay of all local elections due to the COVID-19 pandemic, the seats are up for election after 3 years rather than the usual 4. In that election, Labour won 13 seats (down 8) with 36.6% of the vote, the Liberal Democrats won 9 (up 3) with 21.2%, the Green Party won 6 (up 5) with 20.4%, the Conservatives won 1 (up 1) with 18.4%, and UKIP lost the seat they were defending with 0.2%.

== Previous council composition ==
After 2023 election		Before 2024 election		After 2024 election	
Party	Seats	Party	Seats	Party	Seats
Labour	39	Labour	30	Labour	36
Liberal Democrats	29	Liberal Democrats	29	Liberal Democrats	27
Green	14	Green	14	Green	14
Conservative	1	Conservative	1	Conservative	0
Independent	1	Independent	9	Independent	7

Changes 2023–2024:

- September 2023: Tony Damms, Terry Fox, Denise Fox, Julie Grocutt, Dianne Hurst, Bryan Lodge, and Garry Weatherall suspended from Labour (Note: Part of the Sheffield Community Councillors Group, which is not registered as a political party.)
- October 2023: Paul Wood leaves Labour to sit as an independent
- November 2023: Vickie Priestley (Liberal Democrats) dies; by-election held January 2024
- January 2024: Will Sapwell (Liberal Democrats) wins by-election
- March 2024: Abtisam Mohamed (Labour) resigns; seat left vacant until 2024 election

== Summary ==
The council remained under no overall control. Labour made a net increase of five seats, consolidating their position as the largest party. The Conservatives lost their only seat on the council.

=== Election result ===
Sheffield City Council's composition following the 2024 local elections

2024 Sheffield City Council election
Party	This election				Full council			This election		
Party	Candidates	Seats	Net	Seats %	Other	Total	Total %	Votes	Votes %	+/−
Labour	{{{candidates}}}	15	▲5	51.7	22	36	42.9	49,989	39.3	-0.3
Liberal Democrats	{{{candidates}}}	7	▼2	24.1	20	27	32.1	27,884	21.9	–4.3
Green	{{{candidates}}}	6	Steady	20.7	8	14	16.7	28,180	22.1	+2.7
Independent	{{{candidates}}}	1	▼2	3.4	6	7	8.3	5,336	4.2	+3.9
Conservative	{{{candidates}}}	0	▼1	0.0	0	0	0.0	11,917	9.4	–1.4
TUSC	{{{candidates}}}	0	Steady	0.0	0	0	0.0	2,853	2.2	–0.1
Heritage	{{{candidates}}}	0	Steady	0.0	0	0	0.0	362	0.3	N/A
Reform	{{{candidates}}}	0	Steady	0.0	0	0	0.0	502	0.4	–0.4
Communist	{{{candidates}}}	0	Steady	0.0	0	0	0.0	69	0.1	±0.0

== Ward results ==
The Statement of Persons Nominated, which details the candidates standing in each ward, was released by Sheffield City Council following the close of nominations on 5 April 2024. Sitting councillors standing for re–election are marked with an asterisk (*).

=== Beauchief & Greenhill ===
Beauchief & Greenhill
Party	Candidate	Votes	%	±%
Liberal Democrats	Sophie Thornton*	1,937	42.7	–3.3
Labour	Hafeas Rehman	1,446	31.9	+0.5
Green	Gill Black	574	12.7	+3.2
Conservative	Anne Smith	394	8.7	+0.8
Heritage	Claire Newman	104	2.3	N/A
TUSC	Daniel Smith	81	1.8	+0.4
Majority		491	10.8	–4.5
Turnout		4,536	33.1	–1.7
Registered electors		13,790		
Liberal Democrats hold		Swing	▼1.9	

=== Beighton ===
Beighton
Party	Candidate	Votes	%	±%
Liberal Democrats	Ann Woolhouse*	1,355	37.4	–12.0
Labour	Lisa Banes	1,353	37.3	+3.2
Conservative	Shirley Clayton	579	16.0	+6.4
Green	Stewart Kemp	255	7.0	+2.7
TUSC	Mark Dixey	83	2.3	–0.3
Majority		2	0.1	–15.3
Turnout		3,625	27.7	–1.2
Registered electors		13,228		
Liberal Democrats hold		Swing	▼5.9	

=== Birley ===
Birley
Party	Candidate	Votes	%	±%
Labour	Matthew Dwyer	1,520	47.6	–5.1
Independent	David Cronshaw	647	20.3	N/A
Conservative	Steven Winstone	378	11.8	–8.1
Green	Alan Yearsley	308	9.7	–1.7
Liberal Democrats	Willis Marshall	288	9.0	–0.2
TUSC	Andrea Ugolini	49	1.5	–0.1
Majority		873	27.4	–6.3
Turnout		3,190	25.6	+1.3
Registered electors		12,495		
Labour hold				

=== Broomhill & Sharrow Vale ===
Broomhill & Sharrow Vale
Party	Candidate	Votes	%	±%
Green	Brian Holmshaw*	2,963	51.0	–0.7
Labour Co-op	Abdiaziz Ducaleh	1,951	33.6	–0.3
Liberal Democrats	Patrick Gilbert	355	6.1	–0.4
Conservative	Joanne Lowe	278	4.8	–0.3
TUSC	Edward Boyle	137	2.4	–0.4
Independent	Mike Pomranz	126	2.2	N/A
Majority		1,012	17.4	–0.4
Turnout		5,810	36.9	+5.3
Registered electors		15,848		
Green hold		Swing	▼0.2	

=== Burngreave ===
Burngreave
Party	Candidate	Votes	%	±%
Labour	Safiya Saeed*	1,780	45.1	–21.9
Green	Mustafa Ahmed	894	22.6	+9.9
Independent	Mohammed Nisar	612	15.6	N/A
Liberal Democrats	James Ellwood	302	7.6	–1.5
Conservative	Alma Thule	241	6.1	–0.7
TUSC	Hollie Buisson	119	3	+0.7
Majority		886	22.4	–31.8
Turnout		3,948	27.1	+3.4
Registered electors		14,710		
Labour hold		Swing	▼15.9	

=== City ===
City
Party	Candidate	Votes	%	±%
Green	Douglas Johnson*	1,362	51.4	–2.0
Labour	Thomas Evans	901	34.0	+4.1
Conservative	Ashish Bhandari	162	6.1	+1.2
Liberal Democrats	Shelley Cockayne	141	5.3	±0.0
TUSC	Maddie Rooney	86	3.2	–1.2
Majority		461	17.4	–6.1
Turnout		2,652	20.8	+5.8
Registered electors		12,842		
Green hold		Swing	▼3.0	

=== Crookes & Crosspool ===
Crookes & Crosspool
Party	Candidate	Votes	%	±%
Labour Co-op	Ruth Milsom*	3,310	48.3	+9.9
Liberal Democrats	Jordan Barry	2,188	31.9	–9.9
Green	Oscar Idle	972	14.2	+0.5
Conservative	Marina Round	305	4.5	–0.5
TUSC	Joseph Hibbert	77	1.1	–0.6
Majority		1,122	16.4	N/A
Turnout		6,852	51.0	+5.4
Registered electors		13,518		
Labour Co-op hold		Swing	▲9.6	

=== Darnall ===
Darnall
Party	Candidate	Votes	%	±%
Independent	Qais al-Ahdal	2,402	52.9	N/A
Labour	Sajid Ghafur	1,223	27.0	–41.1
Liberal Democrats	Philip Winn	394	8.7	–5.0
Green	Joydu al–Mahfuz	311	6.9	+1.5
Conservative	Muzafar Rahman	207	4.6	–5.2
Majority		1,179	25.9	N/A
Turnout		4,537	33.1	+9.2
Registered electors		13,835		
Independent gain from Labour				

=== Dore & Totley ===
Dore & Totley
Party	Candidate	Votes	%	±%
Liberal Democrats	Rebecca Atkinson	3,283	51.3	–4.8
Labour	Sam Savory	1,390	21.7	+4.3
Conservative	Zoe Steane	879	13.7	–0.7
Green	Bex Winter	796	12.4	+1.0
TUSC	Luke Brownbill	56	0.9	+0.1
Majority		1,893	29.6	–9.1
Turnout		6,404	44.0	–1.6
Registered electors		14,649		
Liberal Democrats hold		Swing	▼4.6	

=== East Ecclesfield ===
East Ecclesfield
Party	Candidate	Votes	%	±%
Liberal Democrats	Alan Woodcock*	1,906	42.3	+1.7
Labour Co-op	Bridget Kelly	1,705	38.3	–0.2
Conservative	Kevin Mahoney	475	10.7	–1.1
Green	Rosie Trevillion	271	6.1	–0.1
TUSC	Rebecca Fryer	99	2.2	–0.2
Majority		201	4.5	+1.9
Turnout		4,456	32.3	+1.4
Registered electors		13,894		
Liberal Democrats hold		Swing	▲1.0	

=== Ecclesall ===
Ecclesall
Party	Candidate	Votes	%	±%
Green	Peter Gilbert	3,147	37.7	+5.6
Liberal Democrats	Roger Davison*	2,751	33.0	–7.7
Labour	Lisa Markham	1,915	23.0	+2.9
Conservative	Gordon Millward	453	5.4	–0.6
TUSC	Noah Eden	74	0.9	–0.3
Majority		396	4.7	N/A
Turnout		8,340	52.8	–0.3
Registered electors		15,887		
Green gain from Liberal Democrats		Swing	▲6.7	

=== Firth Park ===
By-election due to the resignation of councillor Abtisam Mohamed.

Firth Park (2 seats due to by-election)
Party	Candidate	Votes	%	±%
Labour Co-op	Nikki Belfield	1,605	60.3	+4.1
Labour Co-op	Fran Belbin*	1,585	59.6	+3.4
Green	Eamonn Ward	438	16.5	+0.8
Green	Colin McCulloch	381	14.3	−1.4
Conservative	Brendon Colk	310	11.6	+0.2
Liberal Democrats	Julia Wright	222	8.3	+1.2
Liberal Democrats	Michael Brown	212	8.0	+0.9
Independent	John Booker	201	7.6	N/A
TUSC	Joanna Hall	185	7.0	+4.0
Conservative	Aliou Diallo	184	6.9	−4.5
Turnout		3,046	21.2	+1.5
Registered electors		14,380		
Labour Co-op hold				
Labour Co-op hold				

=== Fulwood ===
Fulwood
Party	Candidate	Votes	%	±%
Liberal Democrats	Sue Alston*	2,952	48.2	–4.0
Labour	Winko Kyaw Oo	1,610	26.3	–1.3
Green	Judith Rutnam	975	15.9	+4.4
Conservative	Thomas Wilson	506	8.3	+0.7
TUSC	John Bunn	78	1.3	+0.1
Majority		1,342	21.9	–2.7
Turnout		6,121	46.8	+0.5
Registered electors		13,177		
Liberal Democrats hold		Swing	▼1.4	

=== Gleadless Valley ===
Gleadless Valley
Party	Candidate	Votes	%	±%
Green	Alexi Dimond*	2,462	52.2	+6.7
Labour Co-op	Bethany Cheshire	1,607	34.0	–3.6
Conservative	Brett Colk	281	6.0	–1.0
Liberal Democrats	John Dryden	238	5.0	–1.2
TUSC	Simon Jenkins	132	2.8	–0.9
Majority		855	18.1	+10.2
Turnout		4,720	35.3	+0.9
Registered electors		13,465		
Green hold		Swing	▲5.2	

=== Graves Park ===
Graves Park
Party	Candidate	Votes	%	±%
Labour	Rob Bannister	1,954	36.4	+0.7
Liberal Democrats	Tariq Zaman	1,856	34.5	–5.6
Green	Thomas Atkin–Withers	1,043	19.4	+5.0
Conservative	Chris Garratt	396	7.4	–0.4
TUSC	Liam Ball	126	2.3	+0.3
Majority		98	1.8	N/A
Turnout		5,375	40.2	–1.7
Registered electors		13,458		
Labour gain from Liberal Democrats		Swing	▲3.2	

=== Hillsborough ===
Hillsborough
Party	Candidate	Votes	%	±%
Green	Christine Gilligan Kubo*	2,726	51.3	+5.2
Labour	Bren Twomey	1,763	33.2	–5.3
Conservative	Patricia Barnsley	363	6.8	–1.7
Liberal Democrats	Chris Lynch	213	4.0	–1.0
Heritage	John Hartley	126	2.4	N/A
TUSC	Leah Byatt	118	2.2	+0.4
Majority		963	18.1	+10.5
Turnout		5,309	36.2	–0.2
Registered electors		14,721		
Green hold		Swing	▲5.3	

=== Manor Castle ===
Manor Castle
Party	Candidate	Votes	%	±%
Labour Co-op	Elle Dodd	1,881	57.6	+13.7
Green	Ruth Flagg–Abbey	603	18.4	–0.6
Conservative	Seun Ajao	308	9.4	+0.4
Independent	Craig Judson	175	5.4	+2.3
Liberal Democrats	Stephanie Kenning	170	5.2	–2.1
TUSC	Alistair Tice	128	3.9	–1.1
Majority		1,278	39.1	N/A
Turnout		3,265	22.0	+1.4
Registered electors		14,938		
Labour Co-op hold		Swing	▲7.2	

=== Mosborough ===
Mosborough
Party	Candidate	Votes	%	±%
Labour	Tony Downing*	2,035	49.0	+11.8
Liberal Democrats	Jonny Dixon	1,523	36.7	–6.4
Conservative	Eve Millward	415	10.0	–2.0
Green	Julie White	150	3.6	–1.6
TUSC	Rory Smith	28	0.7	–1.8
Majority		512	12.3	N/A
Turnout		4,151	31.2	+0.4
Registered electors		13,499		
Labour hold		Swing	▲9.1	

=== Nether Edge & Sharrow ===
Nether Edge & Sharrow
Party	Candidate	Votes	%	±%
Green	Maroof Raouf*	2,662	40.8	+3.2
Labour Co-op	Derek Martin	2,549	39.1	–8.3
Liberal Democrats	Nasar Raoof	501	7.7	–0.3
Independent	Fayyaz Shah Ji	381	5.8	N/A
Conservative	John Chapman	253	3.9	–0.4
TUSC	Bridget Gilbert	172	2.6	–0.1
Majority		113	1.7	N/A
Turnout		6,581	42.9	+0.7
Registered electors		15,362		
Green hold		Swing	▲5.8	

=== Park & Arbourthorne ===
Park & Arbourthorne
Party	Candidate	Votes	%	±%
Labour	Mia Drazaic	1,607	50.8	+0.9
Green	Billie Turner	486	15.4	–1.6
Conservative	Richard Blyth	467	14.8	–3.8
Liberal Democrats	Ann Kingdom	273	8.6	–1.2
SDP	Annie Stoker	175	5.5	N/A
TUSC	Jack Jeffery	153	4.8	±0.0
Majority		1,121	35.5	+4.2
Turnout		3,161	24.4	+0.4
Registered electors		13,090		
Labour hold		Swing	▲1.3	

=== Richmond ===
Richmond
Party	Candidate	Votes	%	±%
Labour	David Barker*	1,728	53.7	+1.4
Reform	Brian Kus	502	15.6	+7.8
Conservative	Christine Saunders	401	12.5	–5.3
Green	Luke Hunt	339	10.5	+1.0
Liberal Democrats	Adil Mohammed	124	3.9	–5.2
TUSC	Sue Statter	124	3.9	+0.4
Majority		1,226	38.1	+3.6
Turnout		3,218	23.5	+0.4
Registered electors		13,798		
Labour hold		Swing	▼3.2	

=== Shiregreen & Brightside ===
Shiregreen & Brightside
Party	Candidate	Votes	%	±%
Labour Co-op	Mark Rusling	1,547	54.5	–5.8
Conservative	Roger Barnsley	434	15.3	–3.8
Green	Joel Gilbert	387	13.6	+2.4
Independent	Tracy Booker	202	7.1	N/A
Liberal Democrats	Rachel Barker	180	6.3	–2.2
TUSC	Patricia Prystupa	88	3.1	N/A
Majority		1,113	39.2	–2.0
Turnout		2,838	20.9	+1.2
Registered electors		13,664		
Labour Co-op hold		Swing	▼1.0	

=== Southey ===
Southey
Party	Candidate	Votes	%	±%
Labour	Gareth Slater	1,438	52.4	–7.7
Green	Andrew Hards	376	13.7	+2.4
Conservative	Andrew Smith	319	11.6	–4.7
Independent	Tony Damms*	318	11.6	N/A
Liberal Democrats	Kevin Grum	196	7.1	–1.2
TUSC	Harry Lomas	99	3.6	–0.5
Majority		1,052	38.3	–8.6
Turnout		2,746	19.7	±0.0
Registered electors		14,018		
Labour hold		Swing	▼5.1	

=== Stannington ===
Stannington
Party	Candidate	Votes	%	±%
Liberal Democrats	Richard Williams*	1,959	40.2	–12.2
Labour Co-op	Lewis Blake Dagnall	1,589	32.6	+9.1
Green	Chris Bragg	692	14.2	+4.8
Conservative	Isaac Howarth	521	10.7	–2.6
TUSC	Robert Simpson	110	2.3	+0.8
Majority		370	7.6	–21.2
Turnout		4,871	34.3	–2.9
Registered electors		14,304		
Liberal Democrats hold		Swing	▼10.7	

=== Stocksbridge & Upper Don ===
Stocksbridge & Upper Don
Party	Candidate	Votes	%	±%
Labour	Mark Whittaker	2,399	49.6	–1.7
Conservative	Matthew Dixon	1,341	27.7	–6.6
Green	David Willington	607	12.5	+5.0
Liberal Democrats	Susan Davidson	398	8.2	+2.6
TUSC	Claire Wraith	95	2.0	+1.1
Majority		1,058	21.9	+4.9
Turnout		4,840	33.7	–2.4
Registered electors		14,495		
Labour gain from Conservative		Swing	▲2.5	

=== Walkley ===
Walkley
Party	Candidate	Votes	%	±%
Labour Co-op	John Wright	2,789	50.2	–0.4
Green	Dylan Lewis–Creser	1,782	32.1	–0.2
Liberal Democrats	Alex Purvis	332	5.8	–0.5
Conservative	Liam Neilson	296	5.3	+0.4
TUSC	Isabelle France	166	3.0	±0.0
Heritage	Tim Grindley	132	2.4	N/A
Communist	Ben Ughetti	69	1.2	N/A
Majority		1,007	18.8	+0.4
Turnout		5,365	37.5	+1.1
Registered electors		14,925		
Labour Co-op gain from Green		Swing	▼0.1	

=== West Ecclesfield ===
West Ecclesfield
Party	Candidate	Votes	%	±%
Liberal Democrats	Ann Whitaker*	1,662	40.4	–4.8
Labour Co-op	Tom Blandford	1,584	38.5	+8.4
Conservative	Scott Darby	465	11.3	+1.8
Green	Kathy Aston	288	7.0	+1.5
TUSC	Christie Littlewood	112	2.7	+1.4
Majority		78	1.9	–13.2
Turnout		4,111	30.8	±0.0
Registered electors		13,463		
Liberal Democrats hold		Swing	▼6.6	

=== Woodhouse ===
Woodhouse
Party	Candidate	Votes	%	±%
Labour Co-op	Mick Rooney*	1,810	57.8	+2.3
Conservative	Mary Love	453	14.5	–6.4
Green	Hannah Nicklin	311	9.9	+0.5
Independent	Jack Carrington	272	8.7	N/A
Liberal Democrats	Charles Edwardson	195	6.2	–3.3
TUSC	Joshua Crapper	89	2.8	–1.8
Majority		1,357	43.4	+8.8
Turnout		3,130	24.6	+0.4
Registered electors		12,780		
Labour Co-op hold		Swing	▲4.4	

== By-elections ==
=== Woodhouse by-election ===
By-election due to the death of councillor Paul Wood.

Woodhouse: 28 November 2024
Party	Candidate	Votes	%	±%
Liberal Democrats	Willis Marshall	1,018	33.0	+26.8
Reform	Andy Hizzard	1,008	32.7	N/A
Labour	Saj Ghafur	650	21.1	−36.7
Green	Hannah Nicklin	168	5.4	−4.5
Conservative	Samuel Hemsley	153	5.0	–9.5
TUSC	Joshua Crapper	56	1.8	–1.0
SDP	Matthew Leese	33	1.1	N/A
Majority		10	0.3	N/A
Turnout		3,092	24.16	−0.4
Registered electors		12,798		
Liberal Democrats gain from Labour		Swing		

=== Stocksbridge and Upper Don by-election ===
By-election due to the resignation of councillor Julie Grocutt.

Stocksbridge and Upper Don: 26 June 2025
Party	Candidate	Votes	%	±%
Reform	John Booker	1,789	32.9	N/A
Liberal Democrats	Stuart Shepherd	1,597	29.4	+21.2
Labour	Josiah Lenton	1,324	24.4	−25.2
Conservative	Matt Dixon	332	6.1	−21.6
Green	Andy Davies	294	5.4	–7.1
Yorkshire	Adam Allcroft	58	1.1	N/A
TUSC	Claire Wraith	43	0.8	−1.2
Majority		192	3.5	N/A
Turnout		5,337	36.8	+3.1
Registered electors				
Reform gain from Labour		Swing		
