= 1976 Sheffield City Council election =

← 1975	6 May 1976	1978 →

31 of 90 seats to Sheffield City Council 46 seats needed for a majority
	First party	Second party	Third party
Party	Labour	Conservative	Liberal
Seats won	20	9	2
Seat change	▼3	▲2	▲1
Majority party before election
Labour Party (UK)
Majority party after election
Labour Party (UK)

Elections to Sheffield City Council were held on 6 May 1976. One third of the council was up for election.

== Election result ==
Sheffield local election result 1976
Party	Seats	Gains	Losses	Net gain/loss	Seats %	Votes %	Votes	+/−
Labour	20	0	-3	-3	64.5	45.4	68,660	+0.3
Conservative	9	+2	0	+2	29.0	38.6	58,323	-2.6
Liberal	2	+1	0	+1	6.1	10.6	15,992	-2.4
Ratepayers	0	0	0	0	0.0	5.0	7,521	N/A
Communist	0	0	0	0	0.0	0.4	536	-0.2
British National	0	0	0	0	0.0	0.1	220	N/A

This result has the following consequences for the total number of seats on the Council after the elections:

Party	Previous council	New council
Labour	66	63
Conservatives	20	22
Liberal	4	5
Ratepayers	0	0
Communist	0	0
British National	0	0
Total	90	90
Working majority	42	36

== Ward results ==
Attercliffe
Party	Candidate	Votes	%	±%
Labour	Daphne Billings	1,708	75.6	+1.6
Conservative	Caroline Viner	552	24.4	−1.5
Majority		1,156	51.2	+3.1
Turnout		2,260		
Labour hold		Swing	+1.5	

Beauchief
Party	Candidate	Votes	%	±%
Conservative	Danny George*	5,175	71.3	−0.5
Labour	Colin Radcliffe	1,419	19.5	+2.8
Liberal	Hazel Clarke	661	9.1	−2.4
Majority		3,756	51.8	−3.3
Turnout		7,255		
Conservative hold		Swing	-1.6	

Birley
Party	Candidate	Votes	%	±%
Labour	Tom Ratcliffe*	3,222	54.9	−1.5
Conservative	Gordon Millward	2,076	35.3	−5.4
Ratepayers	A. Senior	574	9.8	+9.8
Majority		1,146	19.6	+3.9
Turnout		5,872		
Labour hold		Swing	+3.4	

Brightside
Party	Candidate	Votes	%	±%
Labour	George Wilson*	2,347	60.6	−3.8
Conservative	Nicholas Williams	1,072	27.7	+4.8
Ratepayers	Sandra McTear	455	11.7	+11.7
Majority		1,275	32.9	−8.6
Turnout		3,874		
Labour hold		Swing	-4.3	

Broomhill
Party	Candidate	Votes	%	±%
Conservative	Irvine Patnick*	3,943	68.6	+10.3
Labour	Frank White	1,802	31.3	+8.8
Majority		2,141	37.3	+1.5
Turnout		5,745		
Conservative hold		Swing	+0.7	

Burngreave
Party	Candidate	Votes	%	±%
Liberal	Malcolm Johnson*	2,381	53.5	+3.4
Labour	B. Flanagan	1,661	37.3	−7.4
Conservative	Emma Sizer	343	7.7	+3.4
Communist	Alvin Jenkinson	60	1.3	+0.4
Majority		720	16.2	+10.8
Turnout		4,445		
Liberal hold		Swing	+5.4	

Castle
Party	Candidate	Votes	%	±%
Labour	Peter Horton*	1,994	64.1	−0.3
Conservative	Alice Burrows	578	18.6	−2.9
Ratepayers	B. Hopkinson	467	15.0	+15.0
Communist	Violet Gill	73	2.3	−0.2
Majority		1,416	45.5	+2.6
Turnout		3,112		
Labour hold		Swing	+1.3	

Chapel Green
Party	Candidate	Votes	%	±%
Liberal	David Chadwick	4,078	63.2	+15.0
Labour	Arthur Bradbury*	1,561	24.2	−8.7
Conservative	Margaret Scott	814	12.6	−6.3
Majority		2,517	39.0	+23.7
Turnout		6,453		
Liberal gain from Labour		Swing	+11.8	

Darnall
Party	Candidate	Votes	%	±%
Labour	Sidney Dyson*	2,297	55.0	−3.7
Conservative	Shirley Rhodes	1,546	37.0	−4.3
Liberal	Dennis Boothroyd	334	8.0	+8.0
Majority		751	18.0	+0.6
Turnout		4,177		
Labour hold		Swing	+0.3	

Dore
Party	Candidate	Votes	%	±%
Conservative	David Heslop*	4,657	70.6	−9.0
Conservative	Jack Thompson	4,232		
Labour	Robert Jones	1,243	18.8	−1.6
Labour	Alan Wigfield	1,064		
Liberal	Susan Petszaft	699	10.6	+10.6
Liberal	K. Salt	668		
Majority		2,979	51.8	−7.4
Turnout		12,563		
Conservative hold		Swing		
Conservative hold		Swing	-3.7	

Ecclesall
Party	Candidate	Votes	%	±%
Conservative	John Neill*	4,225	63.9	−4.9
Labour	James Moore	939	14.2	−0.6
Liberal	Patrick Smith	725	11.0	−5.3
Ratepayers	W. Needham	718	10.8	+10.8
Majority		3,286	49.7	−2.8
Turnout		6,607		
Conservative hold		Swing	-2.1	

Firth Park
Party	Candidate	Votes	%	±%
Labour	Clive Betts	3,928	58.6	+1.8
Liberal	J. Maling	1,753	26.1	+7.1
Conservative	John Chandler	1,020	15.2	−8.9
Majority		2,175	32.5	−0.2
Turnout		6,701		
Labour hold		Swing	-2.6	

Gleadless
Party	Candidate	Votes	%	±%
Labour	Mike Bower	3,719	49.0	+0.6
Conservative	Stuart Dawson	2,872	37.8	−5.1
Ratepayers	Mary Harrison	507	6.7	+6.7
Liberal	Bob Mumford	496	6.5	−2.1
Majority		847	11.2	+5.7
Turnout		7,594		
Labour hold		Swing	+2.8	

Hallam
Party	Candidate	Votes	%	±%
Conservative	Gordon Wragg*	4,825	69.5	+5.3
Labour	Leon Harris	1,449	20.9	+0.7
Liberal	Jean Mason	662	9.5	−6.0
Majority		3,376	48.6	+4.6
Turnout		6,936		
Conservative hold		Swing	+2.3	

Handsworth
Party	Candidate	Votes	%	±%
Labour	Elsie Smith	2,309	46.2	−13.7
Conservative	Evelyn Millward	1,505	30.1	−1.8
Liberal	Alfred Sellars	762	15.2	+7.0
Ratepayers	M. Sawie	418	8.4	+8.4
Majority		804	16.1	−11.9
Turnout		4,994		
Labour hold		Swing	-5.9	

Heeley
Party	Candidate	Votes	%	±%
Labour	Winifred Golding*	2,886	49.0	−2.6
Conservative	G. Tonks	2,119	36.0	−1.8
Ratepayers	W. Cooper	522	8.9	+8.9
Liberal	Robert Jackson	357	6.0	−4.5
Majority		767	13.0	−0.8
Turnout		5,884		
Labour hold		Swing	-0.4	

Hillsborough
Party	Candidate	Votes	%	±%
Conservative	Elizabeth Hutton	3,109	45.7	−1.4
Labour	Malcolm Leary	2,830	41.6	−1.9
Ratepayers	T. Thompson	477	7.0	+7.0
Liberal	Fleur Woolley	380	5.6	−3.7
Majority		279	4.1	+0.5
Turnout		6,796		
Conservative gain from Labour		Swing	+0.2	

Intake
Party	Candidate	Votes	%	±%
Labour	Arnold Wood*	2,852	50.2	+3.5
Conservative	Anthony Parkin	1,862	32.8	+2.1
Ratepayers	Mildred Hollingsworth	493	8.7	+8.7
Liberal	Alan Thompson	475	8.3	−14.2
Majority		990	17.4	+1.4
Turnout		5,682		
Labour hold		Swing	+0.7	

Manor
Party	Candidate	Votes	%	±%
Labour	Dora Fitter*	2,690	74.0	−0.5
Conservative	Andrew Cook	672	18.5	+4.3
Liberal	F. Robson	179	4.9	−2.5
Communist	John Hukin	93	2.5	−1.3
Majority		2,018	55.5	−4.8
Turnout		3,634		
Labour hold		Swing	-2.4	

Mosborough
Party	Candidate	Votes	%	±%
Labour	Mary Foulds*	2,164	63.3	−0.5
Conservative	Moira Disney	1,253	36.6	+0.5
Majority		911	26.8	−1.0
Turnout		3,417		
Labour hold		Swing	-0.5	

Nether Edge
Party	Candidate	Votes	%	±%
Conservative	Jean Grindrod*	2,961	58.9	+0.7
Labour	C. Morley	1,289	25.6	+3.4
Ratepayers	L. Swann	778	15.5	+15.5
Majority		1,672	33.3	−2.7
Turnout		5,028		
Conservative hold		Swing	-1.3	

Nether Shire
Party	Candidate	Votes	%	±%
Labour	William Eddison*	2,713	69.2	+1.9
Conservative	Anne Marie Roebuck	1,053	26.9	−2.0
Communist	Kenneth Hattersley	152	3.9	+0.2
Majority		1,660	42.3	+3.9
Turnout		3,918		
Labour hold		Swing	+1.9	

Netherthorpe
Party	Candidate	Votes	%	±%
Labour	Doris Mulhearn*	2,196	61.1	−1.2
Conservative	Moira Hattersley	964	26.8	−0.2
British National	J. Judge	220	6.1	+6.1
Liberal	Susan Bowns	215	6.0	−4.7
Majority		1,232	34.3	−1.0
Turnout		3,595		
Labour hold		Swing	-0.5	

Owlerton
Party	Candidate	Votes	%	±%
Labour	Mary Kirk*	2,671	68.0	+19.6
Conservative	Zena Thompson	1,016	25.9	−11.0
Liberal	Susan Taffinder	237	6.0	−8.6
Majority		1,655	42.1	+30.6
Turnout		3,924		
Labour hold		Swing	+15.3	

Park
Party	Candidate	Votes	%	±%
Labour	Sam Wall*	3,161	70.0	+0.8
Conservative	Nicholas Hutton	970	21.5	+4.3
Liberal	F. McKinnon	287	6.3	−4.3
Communist	R. Paulucy	96	2.1	−0.9
Majority		2,191	48.5	−3.5
Turnout		4,514		
Labour hold		Swing	-1.7	

Sharrow
Party	Candidate	Votes	%	±%
Labour	Ian Baxter*	1,802	53.2	−0.9
Conservative	Thomas Seaton	893	26.3	−2.2
Liberal	Michael Ellis	381	11.2	−2.5
Ratepayers	Edith Bush	249	7.3	+7.3
Communist	Neville Taylor	62	1.8	−1.8
Majority		909	26.9	+1.3
Turnout		3,387		
Labour hold		Swing	+0.6	

South Wortley
Party	Candidate	Votes	%	±%
Conservative	Mary Saddington	2,984	45.3	−6.9
Labour	John Laurent	2,846	43.2	−4.5
Liberal	D. Stuart	754	11.4	+11.4
Majority		138	2.1	−2.4
Turnout		6,584		
Conservative gain from Labour		Swing	-1.2	

Southey Green
Party	Candidate	Votes	%	±%
Labour	Sandra Davies	2,754	76.4	−0.3
Conservative	D. Walker	848	23.5	+3.5
Majority		1,906	52.9	−3.8
Turnout		3,602		
Labour hold		Swing	-1.9	

Stocksbridge
Party	Candidate	Votes	%	±%
Labour	Roy Couldwell*	1,945	42.8	−19.0
Ratepayers	Barrie Jones	1,485	32.6	+32.6
Conservative	N. Hogton	1,116	24.5	−13.7
Majority		460	10.2	−13.4
Turnout		4,546		
Labour hold		Swing	-25.8	

Walkley
Party	Candidate	Votes	%	±%
Labour	Alan Billings*	2,263	54.9	+4.0
Conservative	W. Eccles	1,300	31.6	−6.1
Ratepayers	F. Memmott	378	9.2	+9.2
Liberal	A. Gray	176	4.3	−7.0
Majority		963	23.3	+7.0
Turnout		4,117		
Labour hold		Swing	+5.0	

== By-elections between 1976 and 1978 ==
Ecclesall By-Election 28 January 1977
Party	Candidate	Votes	%	±%
Conservative	William Dunsmore	1,985	73.9	+10.0
Liberal	M. McCaig	699	26.0	+15.0
Majority		1,286	47.9	−1.8
Turnout		2,684		
Conservative hold		Swing	-2.5	

Nether Edge By-Election 28 January 1977
Party	Candidate	Votes	%	±%
Conservative	Paul Verhaert	1,341	71.2	+12.3
Liberal	Patrick Smith	541	28.7	+28.7
Majority		800	42.5	+9.2
Turnout		1,882		
Conservative hold		Swing	-8.2	

Manor By-Election 12 August 1977
Party	Candidate	Votes	%	±%
Labour	Colin Radcliffe	1,101	63.6	−10.4
Conservative	Shirley Rhodes	519	29.9	+11.4
Liberal	Robert Mumford	59	3.4	−1.5
Communist	John Hukin	33	1.9	−0.6
British National	Stephen Varley	20	1.1	+1.1
Majority		582	33.7	−21.8
Turnout		1,732	11.0	
Labour hold		Swing	-10.9	
