= 1978 Sheffield City Council election =

← 1976	4 May 1978	1979 →

31 of 90 seats to Sheffield City Council 46 seats needed for a majority
	First party	Second party	Third party
Party	Labour	Conservative	Liberal
Seats won	21	8	2
Seat change	▼3	▲2	▲1
Majority party before election
Labour Party (UK)
Majority party after election
Labour Party (UK)

Elections to Sheffield City Council were held on 4 May 1978. One third of the council was up for election.

== Election result ==
Sheffield local election result 1978
Party	Seats	Gains	Losses	Net gain/loss	Seats %	Votes %	Votes	+/−
Labour	21	0	3	-3	67.7	50.2	75,051	+4.8
Conservative	8	2	0	+2	25.8	40.9	61,093	+2.3
Liberal	2	1	0	+1	6.4	8.0	11,960	-2.6
Independent	0	0	0	0	0	0.5	709	N/A
Communist	0	0	0	0	0	0.3	490	-0.1
British Movement	0	0	0	0	0	0.0	66	New
Workers Revolutionary	0	0	0	0	0	0.0	32	New

This result had the following consequences for the total number of seats on the Council after the elections:

Party	Previous council	New council
Labour	63	60
Conservatives	22	24
Liberal	5	6
Independent	0	0
Communist	0	0
British Movement	0	0
Workers' Revolutionary	0	0
Total	90	90
Working majority	36	30

== Ward results ==
Attercliffe
Party	Candidate	Votes	%	±%
Labour	Harry Firth*	1,402	78.7	+3.1
Labour	David Brown	1,388		
Conservative	A. Calow	378	21.2	−3.2
Conservative	Jonathan Freeman	364		
Majority		1,010	57.5	+6.3
Turnout		3,532		
Labour hold		Swing		
Labour hold		Swing	+3.1	

Beauchief
Party	Candidate	Votes	%	±%
Conservative	Eric Crewe*	5,297	75.8	+4.3
Labour	Richard Caborn	1,685	24.1	+4.6
Majority		3,612	51.7	−0.1
Turnout		6,982		
Conservative hold		Swing	-0.1	

Birley
Party	Candidate	Votes	%	±%
Labour	John G Marshall*	3,218	61.2	+6.3
Conservative	B. Lomas	2,035	38.7	+3.4
Majority		1,183	22.5	+2.9
Turnout		5,253		
Labour hold		Swing	+1.4	

Brightside
Party	Candidate	Votes	%	±%
Labour	Bill Michie*	2,673	69.1	+8.5
Conservative	M. McGrath	1,193	30.8	+3.1
Majority		1,193	38.3	+5.4
Turnout		3,874		
Labour hold		Swing	+2.7	

Broomhill
Party	Candidate	Votes	%	±%
Conservative	Graham Cheetham*	3,217	59.1	−9.5
Labour	J. Bride	1,550	28.5	−2.8
Liberal	Martin Hayes-Allen	672	12.3	+12.3
Majority		1,667	30.6	−6.7
Turnout		5,439		
Conservative hold		Swing	-3.3	

Burngreave
Party	Candidate	Votes	%	±%
Liberal	Francis Butler*	3,133	63.7	+10.2
Labour	Helen Jackson	1,435	29.2	−8.1
Conservative	Emma Sizer	310	6.3	−1.4
Communist	Alvin Jenkinson	38	0.8	−0.5
Majority		1,698	34.5	+18.3
Turnout		4,916		
Liberal hold		Swing	+9.1	

Castle
Party	Candidate	Votes	%	±%
Labour	David Skinner	2,416	77.7	+13.6
Conservative	I. Saunders	646	20.8	+2.2
Communist	Violet Gill	47	1.5	−0.8
Majority		1,770	56.9	+11.4
Turnout		3,109		
Labour hold		Swing	+5.7	

Chapel Green
Party	Candidate	Votes	%	±%
Liberal	Geoffrey Griffiths	3,938	58.3	−4.9
Labour	Tom Steel*	2,115	31.3	+7.1
Conservative	E. King	696	10.3	−2.3
Majority		1,823	27.0	−12.0
Turnout		6,749		
Liberal gain from Labour		Swing	-6.0	

Darnall
Party	Candidate	Votes	%	±%
Labour	Frank Prince*	2,300	59.5	+4.5
Labour	Reg Munn**	2,230		
Conservative	Sid Cordle	1,272	33.1	−3.9
Conservative	Maisie Hyatt	1,247		
Liberal	David Johnson	296	7.4	−0.6
Liberal	Dennis Boothroyd	265		
Majority		1,028	26.4	+8.4
Turnout		7,610		
Labour hold		Swing		
Labour hold		Swing	+4.2	

Reg Munn was a sitting councillor for Castle ward

Dore
Party	Candidate	Votes	%	±%
Conservative	Jack Thompson*	4,749	73.2	+2.6
Labour	Tom Woodhead**	1,733	26.7	+7.9
Majority		3,016	46.5	−5.3
Turnout		6,482		
Conservative hold		Swing	-2.6	

Tom Woodhead was a sitting councillor for Intake.

Ecclesall
Party	Candidate	Votes	%	±%
Conservative	David Pinder*	4,041	68.6	+4.7
Labour	Joan Brown	1,099	18.6	+4.4
Liberal	P. Pughe-Morgan	753	12.8	+1.8
Majority		2,942	50.0	+0.3
Turnout		5,893		
Conservative hold		Swing	+0.1	

Firth Park
Party	Candidate	Votes	%	±%
Labour	Joan Barton	3,878	66.4	+7.8
Conservative	K. Rodgers	1,257	21.5	+6.3
Liberal	J. Maling	700	12.0	−14.1
Majority		2,621	44.9	+12.4
Turnout		5,835		
Labour hold		Swing	+0.7	

Gleadless
Party	Candidate	Votes	%	±%
Labour	Albert Richardson*	3,961	48.3	−0.7
Conservative	W. Bush	3,884	47.4	+9.6
Liberal	Robert Mumford	348	4.2	−2.3
Majority		77	0.9	−10.3
Turnout		8,193		
Labour hold		Swing	-5.2	

Hallam
Party	Candidate	Votes	%	±%
Conservative	Peter Jackson*	4,600	70.9	+1.4
Labour	Dennis Brown	1,885	29.0	+8.1
Majority		2,715	41.9	−6.7
Turnout		6,485		
Conservative hold		Swing	-3.4	

Handsworth
Party	Candidate	Votes	%	±%
Labour	George Nicholls*	2,944	60.2	+14.0
Conservative	Dorothy Kennedy	1,650	33.7	+3.6
Liberal	Alfred Sellars	294	6.0	−9.2
Majority		1,294	26.5	+10.4
Turnout		4,888		
Labour hold		Swing	+5.2	

Heeley
Party	Candidate	Votes	%	±%
Labour	F. Rodgers	3,088	50.9	+1.9
Conservative	Shirley Rhodes	2,535	41.8	+5.8
Liberal	J. Elston	319	5.2	−0.8
Communist	Neville Taylor	119	1.9	+1.9
Majority		553	9.1	−3.9
Turnout		6,061		
Labour hold		Swing	-1.9	

Hillsborough
Party	Candidate	Votes	%	±%
Conservative	A. Banham	3,660	52.8	+7.1
Labour	Alf Meade*	3,274	47.2	+5.6
Majority		386	5.6	+1.5
Turnout		6,934		
Conservative gain from Labour		Swing	+0.7	

Intake
Party	Candidate	Votes	%	±%
Labour	Roger Barton**	3,745	58.4	+8.2
Conservative	J. Howard	2,411	37.6	+4.8
Liberal	P. Clements	259	4.0	−4.3
Majority		1,334	20.8	+3.4
Turnout		6,415		
Labour hold		Swing	+1.7	

Roger Barton was a sitting councillor for Nether Shire

Manor
Party	Candidate	Votes	%	±%
Labour	George Armitage*	2,740	76.3	+2.3
Conservative	Roger Barnsley	747	20.8	+2.3
Communist	John Hukin	73	2.0	−0.5
Workers Revolutionary	P. Littlehales	32	0.9	+0.9
Majority		1,993	55.5	0.0
Turnout		3,592		
Labour hold		Swing	0.0	

Mosborough
Party	Candidate	Votes	%	±%
Labour	Dorothy Walton*	2,929	70.7	+7.4
Conservative	L. Hinchliffe	1,210	29.2	−7.4
Majority		1,719	41.5	+14.8
Turnout		4,139		
Labour hold		Swing	+7.4	

Nether Edge
Party	Candidate	Votes	%	±%
Conservative	Paul Verhaert*	2,588	56.4	−2.5
Labour	F. Woodbine	1,493	32.5	+6.9
Liberal	K. Salt	504	11.0	+11.0
Majority		1,095	23.9	−9.4
Turnout		4,651		
Conservative hold		Swing	-4.7	

Nether Shire
Party	Candidate	Votes	%	±%
Labour	Alan Wigfield	2,778	66.2	−3.0
Conservative	L. Smith	1,323	31.5	+4.6
Communist	Kenneth Hattersley	97	2.3	−1.6
Majority		1,455	34.7	−7.6
Turnout		4,198		
Labour hold		Swing	-3.8	

Netherthorpe
Party	Candidate	Votes	%	±%
Labour	Harold Lambert*	2,315	67.8	+6.7
Conservative	Moira Hattersley	1,034	30.3	+3.5
British Movement	N. Gale	66	1.9	+1.9
Majority		1,281	37.5	+3.2
Turnout		3,415		
Labour hold		Swing	+1.6	

Owlerton
Party	Candidate	Votes	%	±%
Labour	Jack Watson*	2,750	71.7	+3.7
Conservative	P. Stafford	1,083	28.2	+2.3
Majority		1,667	43.5	+1.4
Turnout		3,833		
Labour hold		Swing	+0.7	

Park
Party	Candidate	Votes	%	±%
Labour	Peter Jones*	3,471	77.9	+7.9
Conservative	Nicholas Hutton	926	20.8	−0.7
Communist	R. Paulucy	60	1.3	−0.8
Majority		2,545	57.1	+8.6
Turnout		4,457		
Labour hold		Swing	+4.3	

Sharrow
Party	Candidate	Votes	%	±%
Labour	Howard Knight	1,951	65.7	+12.5
Conservative	Thomas Seaton	960	32.3	+6.0
Communist	Brian Turley	56	1.9	+0.1
Majority		991	33.4	+6.5
Turnout		2,967		
Labour hold		Swing	+3.2	

South Wortley
Party	Candidate	Votes	%	±%
Conservative	A. Mason	3,554	56.7	+11.4
Labour	M. Rudd	2,710	43.2	+0.0
Majority		844	13.5	+11.4
Turnout		6,264		
Conservative gain from Labour		Swing	+5.7	

Southey Green
Party	Candidate	Votes	%	±%
Labour	David Blunkett*	3,423	80.0	+3.6
Conservative	M. Toy	856	20.0	−3.5
Majority		2,567	60.0	+7.1
Turnout		4,279		
Labour hold		Swing	+3.5	

Stocksbridge
Party	Candidate	Votes	%	±%
Labour	Anthony Sweeney*	1,460	35.9	−6.9
Conservative	Barrie Jones	1,156	28.4	+3.9
Liberal	A. Cooke	744	18.3	+18.3
Independent	R. Challis	709	17.4	+17.4
Majority		304	7.5	−2.7
Turnout		4,069		
Labour hold		Swing	-5.4	

Walkley
Party	Candidate	Votes	%	±%
Labour	Paul Wood	2,630	59.0	+4.1
Conservative	M. Maxworthy	1,825	40.9	+9.3
Majority		805	18.1	−5.2
Turnout		4,455		
Labour hold		Swing	+2.6	
