= 2000 Sheffield City Council election =

- 4 May 2000

30 of 87 seats to Sheffield City Council 44 seats needed for a majority
| | First party | Second party | Third party |
|---|---|---|---|
| Party | Liberal Democrats | Labour | Conservative |
| Seats won | 16 | 13 | 1 |
| Seat change | ▲2 | 0 | 0 |
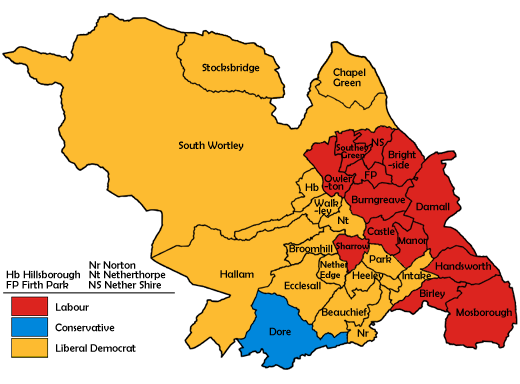
- Map showing the results of the 2000 Sheffield City Council elections.
Majority party before election
Liberal Democrats
Majority party after election
Liberal Democrats

Elections to Sheffield City Council were held on 4 May 2000. One third of the council was up for election. Previous to this election, two Liberal Democrats – Robert Watson and Trefor Morgan – became Independents. Similarly there were two Labour defections, long-time Labour councillor Dorothy Walton went to the Liberal Democrats and Michael Smith became an independent.

The election saw the Liberal Democrats extend their majority through a couple of gains from Labour, with both parties recouping seats where aforementioned defections had taken place. Vote wise, the Liberal Democrat vote notably fell back from their previous elections' consistent increases, whereas the Conservatives managed their best vote share since 1992. Overall turnout was 25.8%.

== Election result ==
Sheffield local election result 2000
| Party | Seats | Gains | Losses | Net gain/loss | Seats % | Votes % | Votes | +/− |
|---|---|---|---|---|---|---|---|---|
| Liberal Democrats | 16 | 3 | 1 | +2 | 53.3 | 45.0 | 44,498 | -5.6 |
| Labour | 13 | 2 | 2 | 0 | 43.3 | 37.3 | 36,866 | -0.6 |
| Conservative | 1 | 0 | 0 | 0 | 3.3 | 14.1 | 13,949 | +4.9 |
| Green | 0 | 0 | 0 | 0 | 0.0 | 2.2 | 2,170 | +1.1 |
| Independent Labour | 0 | 0 | 1 | -1 | 0.0 | 1.1 | 1,098 | +0.6 |
| Socialist | 0 | 0 | 0 | 0 | 0.0 | 0.2 | 178 | ±0.0 |
| Socialist Alliance | 0 | 0 | 0 | 0 | 0.0 | 0.1 | 88 | ±0.0 |
| Socialist Labour | 0 | 0 | 0 | 0 | 0.0 | 0.1 | 76 | -0.1 |

This result has the following consequences for the total number of seats on the council after the elections:

| Party | Previous council | New council |
|---|---|---|
| Liberal Democrats | 46 | 48 |
| Labour | 37 | 37 |
| Conservatives | 1 | 1 |
| Independent Liberal Democrat | 2 | 1 |
| Independent Labour | 1 | 0 |
| Total | 87 | 87 |
| Working majority | 5 | 9 |

== Ward results ==
Beauchief
| Party | Candidate | Votes | % | ±% |
|---|---|---|---|---|
| Liberal Democrats | Mike Davis | 2,840 | 59.9 | −6.3 |
| Labour | Andy Hinman | 1,242 | 26.2 | +1.2 |
| Conservative | Matthew Peck | 659 | 13.9 | +5.1 |
| Majority | | 1,598 | 33.7 | −7.5 |
| Turnout | | 4,741 | 32.7 | −7.2 |
| Liberal Democrats hold | | Swing | -3.7 | |

Birley
| Party | Candidate | Votes | % | ±% |
|---|---|---|---|---|
| Labour | Angela Smith** | 2,105 | 48.6 | +4.8 |
| Liberal Democrats | Robert Sheridan | 1,904 | 44.0 | −7.8 |
| Conservative | Evelyn Millward | 321 | 7.4 | +3.0 |
| Majority | | 201 | 4.6 | −3.4 |
| Turnout | | 4,330 | 30.6 | −2.4 |
| Labour hold | | Swing | +6.3 | |

Angela Smith was a sitting councillor for Broomhill ward

Brightside
| Party | Candidate | Votes | % | ±% |
|---|---|---|---|---|
| Labour | Peter Price* | 1,399 | 63.7 | +8.1 |
| Liberal Democrats | Jeff Staniforth | 483 | 22.0 | −15.0 |
| Conservative | Eric Kirby | 238 | 10.8 | +6.2 |
| Socialist Labour | Robert Morris | 76 | 3.4 | +0.7 |
| Majority | | 916 | 41.7 | +23.1 |
| Turnout | | 2,196 | 18.9 | −6.2 |
| Labour hold | | Swing | +11.5 | |

Broomhill
| Party | Candidate | Votes | % | ±% |
|---|---|---|---|---|
| Liberal Democrats | Paul Scriven | 2,115 | 57.3 | +3.0 |
| Labour | Tim Rippon | 781 | 21.2 | −10.0 |
| Conservative | Michael Ginn | 528 | 14.3 | +2.7 |
| Green | Joseph Otten | 266 | 7.2 | +4.4 |
| Majority | | 1,334 | 36.1 | +13.0 |
| Turnout | | 3,690 | 24.6 | −5.4 |
| Liberal Democrats gain from Labour | | Swing | +6.5 | |

Burngreave
| Party | Candidate | Votes | % | ±% |
|---|---|---|---|---|
| Labour | Ibrar Hussain | 894 | 37.5 | −12.5 |
| Independent Labour | James Jamison | 597 | 25.0 | +2.5 |
| Liberal Democrats | Mohammed Nazir | 570 | 23.9 | +9.0 |
| Conservative | Nicholas Bryan | 198 | 8.3 | +1.8 |
| Green | Chris Sissons | 78 | 3.3 | +0.3 |
| Socialist Alliance | Alison Brown | 49 | 2.0 | −1.0 |
| Majority | | 297 | 12.5 | −15.0 |
| Turnout | | 2,386 | 27.6 | −2.4 |
| Labour hold | | Swing | -7.5 | |

Castle
| Party | Candidate | Votes | % | ±% |
|---|---|---|---|---|
| Labour | Jan Wilson** | 1,130 | 65.3 | −2.3 |
| Liberal Democrats | Michael Coleman | 314 | 18.1 | −3.0 |
| Conservative | Michael Young | 149 | 8.6 | +3.6 |
| Green | Graham Wroe | 95 | 5.5 | +2.2 |
| Socialist | Rebecca Fryer | 41 | 2.4 | −0.5 |
| Majority | | 816 | 47.2 | +0.7 |
| Turnout | | 1,729 | 19.7 | −5.2 |
| Labour hold | | Swing | +0.3 | |

Jan Wilson was a sitting councillor for Intake ward

Chapel Green
| Party | Candidate | Votes | % | ±% |
|---|---|---|---|---|
| Liberal Democrats | Kathleen Chadwick* | 2,282 | 55.3 | −8.1 |
| Labour | Sheila Tyler | 1,483 | 35.9 | +4.0 |
| Conservative | Alistair Lofthouse | 364 | 8.8 | +4.1 |
| Majority | | 799 | 19.3 | −12.2 |
| Turnout | | 4,129 | 23.0 | −6.0 |
| Liberal Democrats hold | | Swing | -6.0 | |

Darnall
| Party | Candidate | Votes | % | ±% |
|---|---|---|---|---|
| Labour | Terry Barrow | 2,113 | 58.2 | +12.7 |
| Liberal Democrats | Edward Pinder | 1,227 | 33.8 | −15.5 |
| Conservative | Gordon Millward | 291 | 8.0 | +2.8 |
| Majority | | 886 | 24.4 | +20.7 |
| Turnout | | 3,631 | 27.3 | −4.1 |
| Labour hold | | Swing | +14.1 | |

Dore
| Party | Candidate | Votes | % | ±% |
|---|---|---|---|---|
| Conservative | Anne Smith | 2,776 | 46.6 | +19.1 |
| Liberal Democrats | Mohammed Zahur | 2,457 | 41.2 | −18.0 |
| Labour | Sam Wall | 725 | 12.2 | −1.1 |
| Majority | | 319 | 5.3 | −26.4 |
| Turnout | | 5,958 | 39.7 | −2.6 |
| Conservative hold | | Swing | +18.5 | |

Ecclesall
| Party | Candidate | Votes | % | ±% |
|---|---|---|---|---|
| Liberal Democrats | Kate Dawson* | 3,289 | 57.2 | −2.5 |
| Conservative | David Pinder | 1,570 | 27.3 | +2.1 |
| Labour | John Darwin | 645 | 11.2 | −3.9 |
| Green | Denise Craghill | 244 | 4.2 | +4.2 |
| Majority | | 1,719 | 29.9 | −4.5 |
| Turnout | | 5,748 | 37.5 | −5.4 |
| Liberal Democrats hold | | Swing | -2.3 | |

Firth Park
| Party | Candidate | Votes | % | ±% |
|---|---|---|---|---|
| Labour | Alan Law* | 1,548 | 66.4 | +9.5 |
| Liberal Democrats | Terry McCartney | 505 | 21.6 | −15.0 |
| Conservative | Neville Paling | 278 | 11.9 | +5.4 |
| Majority | | 1,043 | 44.7 | +24.4 |
| Turnout | | 2,331 | 20.7 | −5.3 |
| Labour hold | | Swing | +12.2 | |

Hallam
| Party | Candidate | Votes | % | ±% |
|---|---|---|---|---|
| Liberal Democrats | John Knight* | 3,151 | 55.9 | +0.1 |
| Conservative | Matthew Wilson | 1,680 | 29.8 | +0.2 |
| Labour | Martin Newsome | 801 | 14.2 | −0.4 |
| Majority | | 1,471 | 26.1 | −0.1 |
| Turnout | | 5,632 | 38.8 | −5.5 |
| Liberal Democrats hold | | Swing | -0.0 | |

Handsworth
| Party | Candidate | Votes | % | ±% |
|---|---|---|---|---|
| Labour | Michael Rooney* | 1,813 | 55.2 | −7.1 |
| Liberal Democrats | Penny Baker | 646 | 19.6 | −11.5 |
| Independent Labour | Elsie Smith | 501 | 15.2 | +15.2 |
| Conservative | Laurence Hayward | 326 | 9.9 | +3.3 |
| Majority | | 1,167 | 35.5 | +4.3 |
| Turnout | | 3,286 | 23.3 | −4.5 |
| Labour hold | | Swing | +2.2 | |

Heeley
| Party | Candidate | Votes | % | ±% |
|---|---|---|---|---|
| Liberal Democrats | Ian Richardson | 1,693 | 48.3 | −10.0 |
| Labour | Stephen Caban | 1,332 | 38.0 | +3.6 |
| Green | Robert Unwin | 270 | 7.7 | +5.2 |
| Conservative | Darren Bird | 208 | 5.9 | +3.3 |
| Majority | | 361 | 10.3 | −13.6 |
| Turnout | | 3,503 | 26.8 | −7.9 |
| Liberal Democrats gain from Ind. Lib Dem | | Swing | -6.8 | |

Hillsborough
| Party | Candidate | Votes | % | ±% |
|---|---|---|---|---|
| Liberal Democrats | Peter MacLoughlin* | 1,840 | 50.5 | −10.2 |
| Labour | Edward Heath-Whyte | 1,310 | 35.9 | +4.0 |
| Conservative | Thomas Seaton | 353 | 9.7 | +4.7 |
| Green | Chris McMahon | 141 | 3.9 | +1.5 |
| Majority | | 530 | 14.5 | −14.3 |
| Turnout | | 3,644 | 25.9 | −7.1 |
| Liberal Democrats hold | | Swing | -7.1 | |

Intake
| Party | Candidate | Votes | % | ±% |
|---|---|---|---|---|
| Liberal Democrats | Robert McCann | 1,842 | 50.3 | −1.7 |
| Labour | Martin Lawton | 1,539 | 42.0 | −0.8 |
| Conservative | Alistair Harkness | 281 | 7.7 | +2.6 |
| Majority | | 303 | 8.3 | −0.9 |
| Turnout | | 3,662 | 25.7 | −6.4 |
| Liberal Democrats gain from Labour | | Swing | -0.4 | |

Manor
| Party | Candidate | Votes | % | ±% |
|---|---|---|---|---|
| Labour | Harry Harpham | 964 | 66.2 | +1.6 |
| Liberal Democrats | Judy Webster | 243 | 16.7 | −10.8 |
| Conservative | Andrew Watson | 143 | 9.8 | +5.1 |
| Socialist | Alistair Tice | 106 | 7.3 | +4.1 |
| Majority | | 721 | 49.5 | +12.5 |
| Turnout | | 1,456 | 17.9 | −5.6 |
| Labour gain from Independent Labour | | Swing | +6.2 | |

Mosborough
| Party | Candidate | Votes | % | ±% |
|---|---|---|---|---|
| Labour | Barbara Belcher | 2,491 | 50.8 | −0.1 |
| Liberal Democrats | Dorothy Walton* | 1,593 | 32.5 | −5.1 |
| Conservative | Shirley Clayton | 816 | 16.6 | +6.2 |
| Majority | | 898 | 18.3 | +5.0 |
| Turnout | | 4,900 | 19.0 | −3.8 |
| Labour gain from Liberal Democrats | | Swing | +2.5 | |

Dorothy Walton was previously elected as a Labour councillor

Nether Edge
| Party | Candidate | Votes | % | ±% |
|---|---|---|---|---|
| Liberal Democrats | Ali Qadar* | 2,343 | 59.6 | +5.4 |
| Labour | Graham Armitage | 973 | 24.7 | −11.1 |
| Conservative | Anthony Cherry | 317 | 8.1 | +3.3 |
| Green | Mervyn Smith | 297 | 7.5 | +2.4 |
| Majority | | 1,370 | 34.8 | +16.3 |
| Turnout | | 3,930 | 31.8 | −6.2 |
| Liberal Democrats hold | | Swing | +8.2 | |

Nether Shire
| Party | Candidate | Votes | % | ±% |
|---|---|---|---|---|
| Labour | Jane Bird* | 1,414 | 63.6 | +4.7 |
| Liberal Democrats | John Tomlinson | 533 | 24.0 | −11.6 |
| Conservative | Phillip Kirby | 237 | 10.6 | +6.4 |
| Socialist Alliance | Shirley Frost | 39 | 1.7 | +0.5 |
| Majority | | 881 | 39.6 | +16.3 |
| Turnout | | 2,223 | 19.4 | −5.8 |
| Labour hold | | Swing | +8.1 | |

Netherthorpe
| Party | Candidate | Votes | % | ±% |
|---|---|---|---|---|
| Liberal Democrats | Sylvia Anginotti* | 1,384 | 56.5 | +5.5 |
| Labour | Kashaf Walayat | 709 | 28.9 | −10.3 |
| Green | Barry New | 253 | 10.3 | +5.1 |
| Conservative | Ian Ramsey | 102 | 4.2 | +1.5 |
| Majority | | 675 | 27.6 | +15.8 |
| Turnout | | 2,448 | 21.3 | −7.7 |
| Liberal Democrats hold | | Swing | +7.9 | |

Norton
| Party | Candidate | Votes | % | ±% |
|---|---|---|---|---|
| Liberal Democrats | Chris Tutt* | 1,691 | 52.7 | −4.3 |
| Labour | Janine Stafford | 1,193 | 37.2 | +0.1 |
| Conservative | Peter Smith | 326 | 10.1 | +4.2 |
| Majority | | 498 | 15.5 | −4.4 |
| Turnout | | 3,210 | 28.3 | −6.9 |
| Liberal Democrats hold | | Swing | -2.2 | |

Owlerton
| Party | Candidate | Votes | % | ±% |
|---|---|---|---|---|
| Labour | Chris Weldon | 1,303 | 55.8 | +6.4 |
| Liberal Democrats | Ian Heeley | 837 | 35.9 | −7.9 |
| Conservative | Kevin Mahoney | 193 | 8.3 | +4.7 |
| Majority | | 466 | 20.0 | +14.4 |
| Turnout | | 2,333 | 21.2 | −9.3 |
| Labour hold | | Swing | +7.1 | |

Park
| Party | Candidate | Votes | % | ±% |
|---|---|---|---|---|
| Liberal Democrats | Elizabeth Taylor* | 1,373 | 54.9 | +3.5 |
| Labour | Steve Barnard** | 1,030 | 41.2 | −1.9 |
| Conservative | John Morton | 67 | 2.7 | +0.9 |
| Socialist | Terry Wykes | 31 | 1.2 | −1.7 |
| Majority | | 343 | 13.7 | +5.4 |
| Turnout | | 2,501 | 25.7 | −1.7 |
| Liberal Democrats hold | | Swing | +2.7 | |

The Liberal Democrats had gained the Park seat in a by-election Steve Barnard was a sitting councillor for Darnall ward

Sharrow
| Party | Candidate | Votes | % | ±% |
|---|---|---|---|---|
| Labour | Basheer Khan | 1,405 | 57.9 | −1.8 |
| Liberal Democrats | John Williamson | 610 | 25.2 | −1.9 |
| Green | Martin D'Agorne | 207 | 8.5 | +3.6 |
| Conservative | Joan Graham | 202 | 8.3 | +1.6 |
| Majority | | 795 | 32.8 | +0.3 |
| Turnout | | 2,424 | 20.0 | −2.8 |
| Labour hold | | Swing | +0.0 | |

South Wortley
| Party | Candidate | Votes | % | ±% |
|---|---|---|---|---|
| Liberal Democrats | Arthur Dunworth* | 2,755 | 57.9 | −6.7 |
| Labour | Sarah Tyler | 1,341 | 28.2 | +1.2 |
| Conservative | Graham King | 657 | 13.8 | +5.4 |
| Majority | | 1,414 | 29.7 | −7.9 |
| Turnout | | 4,753 | 25.8 | −7.2 |
| Liberal Democrats hold | | Swing | -3.9 | |

Southey Green
| Party | Candidate | Votes | % | ±% |
|---|---|---|---|---|
| Labour | Peter Procter | 1,275 | 70.4 | +0.3 |
| Liberal Democrats | Sheila Tomlinson | 342 | 18.9 | −7.7 |
| Conservative | George Kirtley | 193 | 10.6 | +7.4 |
| Majority | | 933 | 51.5 | +8.0 |
| Turnout | | 1,810 | 18.5 | −7.2 |
| Labour hold | | Swing | +4.0 | |

Stocksbridge
| Party | Candidate | Votes | % | ±% |
|---|---|---|---|---|
| Liberal Democrats | Maureen Brelsford* | 1,579 | 64.8 | −10.8 |
| Labour | Alan Wray | 589 | 24.2 | +4.0 |
| Conservative | Molly Goldring | 269 | 11.0 | +6.8 |
| Majority | | 990 | 40.6 | −14.8 |
| Turnout | | 2,437 | 23.1 | −4.2 |
| Liberal Democrats hold | | Swing | -7.4 | |

Walkley
| Party | Candidate | Votes | % | ±% |
|---|---|---|---|---|
| Liberal Democrats | Diane Leek* | 2,057 | 54.3 | −0.3 |
| Liberal Democrats | Vickie Priestley | 1,754 | | |
| Labour | Alan Garner | 1,319 | 34.8 | −2.4 |
| Labour | Veronica Hardstaff | 1,286 | | |
| Green | Nicola Freeman | 319 | 8.4 | +3.3 |
| Conservative | Vennessa Nesbit | 207 | 5.5 | +2.5 |
| Conservative | Peter Smith | 175 | | |
| Majority | | 738 | 15.9 | −1.6 |
| Turnout | | 3,787 | 28.1 | −4.4 |
| Liberal Democrats hold | | Swing | | |
| Liberal Democrats hold | | Swing | +1.0 | |

== By-elections between 2000 and 2002 ==
Park By-Election 19 October 2000
| Party | Candidate | Votes | % | ±% |
|---|---|---|---|---|
| Labour | Julie Dore | 979 | 53.3 | +12.1 |
| Liberal Democrats | David Willis | 812 | 44.2 | −10.7 |
| Conservative | | 45 | 2.5 | −0.2 |
| Majority | | 167 | 9.1 | −4.6 |
| Turnout | | 1,836 | 18.8 | −6.9 |
| Labour hold | | Swing | +11.4 | |

Southey Green By-Election 19 October 2000
| Party | Candidate | Votes | % | ±% |
|---|---|---|---|---|
| Labour | Tim Rippon | 1,155 | 75.0 | +4.6 |
| Liberal Democrats | Sheila Tomlinson | 384 | 25.0 | +6.1 |
| Majority | | 771 | 50.0 | −1.5 |
| Turnout | | 1,539 | 15.7 | −2.8 |
| Labour hold | | Swing | -0.7 | |
