= 1999 Sheffield City Council election =

← 1998	6 May 1999	2000 →

29 of 87 seats to Sheffield City Council 44 seats needed for a majority
	First party	Second party	Third party
Party	Liberal Democrats	Labour	Conservative
Seats won	18	11	0
Seat change	▲10	▼10	0
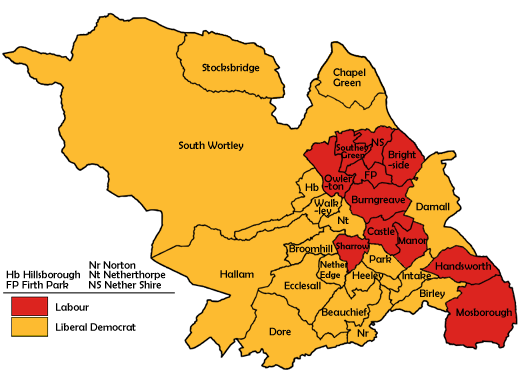
- Map showing the results of the 1999 Sheffield City Council elections.
Majority party before election
Labour Party (UK)
Majority party after election
Liberal Democrats

Elections to Sheffield City Council were held on 6 May 1999 with one third of the council up for election. Previous to this election, there had been a by-election in Park, resulting in a Liberal Democrat gain from Labour, effectively cancelling out the concurrent defection of sitting Stocksbridge councillor Alan Pears from the Lib Dems to Labour. The election saw the Liberal Democrats gain control of the council - the first time since its formation for it not to be controlled by Labour. The results themselves were more favourable to Labour than recent elections. However, they suffered double-digit losses, with the Liberal Democrats sustaining their recent election surges.

== Election results ==
Sheffield local election result 1999
Party	Seats	Gains	Losses	Net gain/loss	Seats %	Votes %	Votes	+/−
Liberal Democrats	18	10	0	+10	62.1	50.6	60,512	+0.4
Labour	11	0	10	-10	37.9	37.9	45,278	+2.3
Conservative	0	0	0	0	0.0	9.2	11,045	-2.5
Green	0	0	0	0	0.0	1.1	1,319	-0.1
Independent Labour	0	0	0	0	0.0	0.5	597	±0.0
Socialist Labour	0	0	0	0	0.0	0.2	287	+0.1
Socialist Alternative	0	0	0	0	0.0	0.2	204	-0.2
Socialist Alliance	0	0	0	0	0.0	0.1	114	±0.0
Socialist Workers	0	0	0	0	0.0	0.1	61	+0.1
Ind. Conservative	0	0	0	0	0.0	0.0	59	-0.1
Independent Green	0	0	0	0	0.0	0.0	41	New

This result had the following consequences for the total number of seats on the council after the elections:

Party	Previous council	New council
Liberal Democrats	36	47
Labour	50	39
Conservatives	1	1
Total	87	87
Working majority	13	7

== Ward results ==
Beauchief
Party	Candidate	Votes	%	±%
Liberal Democrats	Andy Sangar*	3,806	66.2	+0.8
Labour	Andy Hinman**	1,435	25.0	+2.1
Conservative	Frank Woodger	505	8.8	−2.9
Majority		2,371	41.2	−1.2
Turnout		5,746	39.9	+7.1
Liberal Democrats hold		Swing	-1.3	

Andy Hinman was a sitting councillor for Nether Edge ward

Birley
Party	Candidate	Votes	%	±%
Liberal Democrats	David Baker	2,408	51.8	+17.3
Labour	Elsie Smith*	2,034	43.8	−9.0
Conservative	Evelyn Millward	204	4.4	−8.3
Majority		374	8.0	−10.3
Turnout		4,646	33.0	+11.4
Liberal Democrats gain from Labour		Swing	+13.1	

Brightside
Party	Candidate	Votes	%	±%
Labour	John Webster*	1,581	55.6	+0.1
Liberal Democrats	Jeff Staniforth	1,053	37.0	+3.7
Conservative	Marjorie Kirby	131	4.6	−2.8
Socialist Labour	Robert Morris	77	2.7	−1.0
Majority		528	18.6	−3.6
Turnout		2,842	25.1	+6.9
Labour hold		Swing	-1.8	

Broomhill
Party	Candidate	Votes	%	±%
Liberal Democrats	Janice Sidebottom	2,369	54.3	+3.9
Labour	Barbara Belcher*	1,360	31.2	+2.5
Conservative	Graham King	507	11.6	−5.9
Green	Joseph Otten	124	2.8	−0.6
Majority		1,009	23.1	+1.4
Turnout		4,360	30.0	+4.9
Liberal Democrats gain from Labour		Swing	+0.7	

Burngreave
Party	Candidate	Votes	%	±%
Labour	Steve Jones*	1,329	50.0	+13.5
Independent Labour	James Jamison	597	22.5	−5.9
Liberal Democrats	Haq Nawaz	396	14.9	−3.2
Conservative	Nicholas Bryan	173	6.5	−2.4
Green	Chris Sissons	81	3.0	−1.2
Socialist Alliance	Alison Brown	80	3.0	−0.8
Majority		732	27.5	+9.1
Turnout		2,656	30.0	+9.2
Labour hold		Swing	+9.7	

Castle
Party	Candidate	Votes	%	±%
Labour	Pat Midgley*	1,497	67.6	+11.2
Liberal Democrats	Jim Morland	467	21.1	−2.1
Conservative	Michael Young	112	5.0	−2.8
Green	Graham Wroe	74	3.3	−2.7
Socialist Alternative	Rebecca Fryer	65	2.9	−3.6
Majority		1,030	46.5	+13.3
Turnout		2,215	24.9	+9.3
Labour hold		Swing	+6.6	

Chapel Green
Party	Candidate	Votes	%	±%
Liberal Democrats	Graham Oxley	3,269	63.4	−1.8
Labour	Matthew Tracey	1,646	31.9	+1.9
Conservative	Paula Axelby	243	4.7	−0.1
Majority		1,623	31.5	−3.7
Turnout		5,158	29.0	+2.6
Liberal Democrats hold		Swing	-1.8	

Darnall
Party	Candidate	Votes	%	±%
Liberal Democrats	Terry McElligott	2,049	49.3	+10.8
Labour	Kashaf Walayat*	1,895	45.5	−8.5
Conservative	Margaret Pigott	215	5.2	−2.3
Majority		154	3.7	−11.7
Turnout		4,159	31.4	+8.4
Liberal Democrats gain from Labour		Swing	+9.6	

Dore
Party	Candidate	Votes	%	±%
Liberal Democrats	Keith Hill	3,773	59.2	+0.1
Conservative	John Berry	1,754	27.5	−3.9
Labour	Robert Earp	848	13.3	+3.9
Majority		2,019	31.7	+4.1
Turnout		6,375	42.3	+0.4
Liberal Democrats hold		Swing	+2.0	

Ecclesall
Party	Candidate	Votes	%	±%
Liberal Democrats	Sylvia Dunkley*	3,962	59.7	+0.2
Conservative	John Harthman	1,674	25.2	−2.8
Labour	Sandra Robinson	1,004	15.1	+2.6
Majority		2,288	34.4	+2.9
Turnout		6,640	42.9	+6.0
Liberal Democrats hold		Swing	+1.5	

Firth Park
Party	Candidate	Votes	%	±%
Labour	Ilyas Khan*	1,686	56.9	−6.2
Liberal Democrats	Ian Heeley	1,084	36.6	+11.2
Conservative	Neville Paling	194	6.5	−4.9
Majority		602	20.3	−17.3
Turnout		2,964	26.0	+5.7
Labour hold		Swing	-8.7	

Hallam
Party	Candidate	Votes	%	±%
Liberal Democrats	John Hesketh*	3,600	55.8	−5.6
Conservative	Sidney Cordle	1,909	29.6	+3.9
Labour	Donald Henderson	945	14.6	+1.8
Majority		1,691	26.2	−9.5
Turnout		6,454	44.3	+6.1
Liberal Democrats hold		Swing	-4.7	

Handsworth
Party	Candidate	Votes	%	±%
Labour	Marjorie Barker*	2,414	62.3	+7.6
Liberal Democrats	Howard Middleton	1,204	31.1	−3.0
Conservative	Laurence Hayward	257	6.6	−4.5
Majority		1,210	31.2	+10.6
Turnout		3,875	27.8	+6.6
Labour hold		Swing	+5.3	

Heeley
Party	Candidate	Votes	%	±%
Liberal Democrats	Tessa Hainey	2,679	58.3	+1.2
Labour	Andy Kershaw	1,580	34.4	−4.5
Conservative	Celia Dutton	120	2.6	−1.4
Green	Denise Craghill	114	2.5	+2.5
Socialist Labour	Tony Horsefield	103	2.2	+2.2
Majority		1,099	23.9	+5.8
Turnout		4,596	34.7	+5.7
Liberal Democrats gain from Labour		Swing	+2.8	

Hillsborough
Party	Candidate	Votes	%	±%
Liberal Democrats	Alison Macfarlane*	2,805	60.7	+2.0
Labour	Harry Harpham	1,473	31.9	−4.0
Conservative	Thomas Seaton	233	5.0	−0.4
Green	Chris Mahone	110	2.4	+2.4
Majority		1,332	28.8	+6.1
Turnout		4,621	33.0	+2.1
Liberal Democrats hold		Swing	+3.0	

Intake
Party	Candidate	Votes	%	±%
Liberal Democrats	Frank Taylor	2,377	52.0	−3.2
Labour	Martin Lawton*	1,957	42.8	+5.4
Conservative	Eric Kirby	234	5.1	−2.2
Majority		420	9.2	−8.6
Turnout		4,568	32.1	+7.8
Liberal Democrats gain from Labour		Swing	-4.3	

Manor
Party	Candidate	Votes	%	±%
Labour	Gillian Furniss	1,241	64.6	+6.9
Liberal Democrats	Robert Sheridan	529	27.5	−3.2
Conservative	Andrew Watson	90	4.7	−2.2
Socialist Alternative	Alistair Tice	61	3.2	−1.4
Majority		712	37.0	+10.1
Turnout		1,921	23.5	+5.9
Labour hold		Swing	+5.0	

Mosborough
Party	Candidate	Votes	%	±%
Labour	Chris Rosling-Joseph*	2,947	50.9	−0.9
Liberal Democrats	Peter Fox**	2,179	37.6	+8.1
Conservative	Shirley Clayton	604	10.4	−6.1
Ind. Conservative	Colin Taylor	59	1.0	−1.2
Majority		768	13.3	−9.0
Turnout		5,789	22.8	+5.9
Labour hold		Swing	-4.5	

Peter Fox was a sitting councillor for Dore ward

Nether Edge
Party	Candidate	Votes	%	±%
Liberal Democrats	Pat White	2,661	54.2	+1.8
Labour	Mohammed Khan	1,755	35.8	+1.2
Conservative	Anthony Cherry	236	4.8	−2.1
Green	Mervyn Smith	252	5.1	−1.0
Majority		906	18.5	+0.8
Turnout		4,904	38.0	+6.5
Liberal Democrats gain from Labour		Swing	+0.3	

Nether Shire
Party	Candidate	Votes	%	±%
Labour	Bill Eddison*	1,707	58.9	+5.6
Liberal Democrats	John Tomlinson	1,031	35.6	−4.1
Conservative	Phillip Kirby	123	4.2	−2.7
Socialist Alliance	Shirley Frost	34	1.2	+1.2
Majority		676	23.3	+9.8
Turnout		2,895	25.2	+5.1
Labour hold		Swing	+4.8	

Netherthorpe
Party	Candidate	Votes	%	±%
Liberal Democrats	Matthew Dixon	1,719	51.0	−7.1
Labour	Tony Arber*	1,322	39.2	+6.5
Green	Barry New	176	5.2	+0.2
Conservative	Ian Ramsey	91	2.7	+0.4
Socialist Workers	Phil Turner	61	1.8	+0.0
Majority		397	11.8	−13.6
Turnout		3,369	29.0	
Liberal Democrats gain from Labour		Swing	-6.8	

Norton
Party	Candidate	Votes	%	±%
Liberal Democrats	Ian Auckland	2,280	57.0	+0.8
Labour	Frank White*	1,483	37.1	+0.1
Conservative	Peter Smith	236	5.9	−0.9
Majority		797	19.9	+0.7
Turnout		3,999	35.2	+3.1
Liberal Democrats gain from Labour		Swing	+0.3	

Owlerton
Party	Candidate	Votes	%	±%
Labour	Mark Wilde	1,669	49.4	+2.3
Liberal Democrats	Wayne Morton	1,480	43.8	−2.5
Conservative	Kevin Mahoney	121	3.6	−3.0
Socialist Labour	Brian Fisher	107	3.2	+3.2
Majority		189	5.6	+4.8
Turnout		3,377	30.5	+10.0
Labour hold		Swing	+2.4	

Park
Party	Candidate	Votes	%	±%
Liberal Democrats	Dave Willis	1,391	51.4	+22.7
Labour	Viv Nicholson*	1,165	43.1	−7.8
Socialist Alternative	Ken Douglas	78	2.9	−11.0
Conservative	Simon Shepherd	48	1.8	−4.7
Green	Peter Hartley	23	0.8	+0.8
Majority		226	8.3	−13.9
Turnout		2,705	27.4	+13.3
Liberal Democrats gain from Labour		Swing	+15.2	

Sharrow
Party	Candidate	Votes	%	±%
Labour	Mohammed Nazir*	1,650	59.7	+6.7
Liberal Democrats	Lai Wah Wong	750	27.1	−2.9
Conservative	Joan Graham	186	6.7	−3.1
Green	Martin D'Agorne	137	4.9	−2.2
Independent Green	Michael Jennings	41	1.5	+1.5
Majority		900	32.5	+9.5
Turnout		2,764	22.8	+6.1
Labour hold		Swing	+4.8	

South Wortley
Party	Candidate	Votes	%	±%
Liberal Democrats	Trevor Bagshaw*	3,888	64.6	+1.8
Labour	Steve Caban	1,626	27.0	+1.4
Conservative	Paul Clewes	504	8.4	−0.3
Majority		2,262	37.6	+0.4
Turnout		6,018	33.0	+5.6
Liberal Democrats hold		Swing	+0.2	

Southey Green
Party	Candidate	Votes	%	±%
Labour	Tony Damms*	1,784	70.1	+8.6
Liberal Democrats	Fern Newman	677	26.6	−8.2
Conservative	George Kirtley	83	3.2	−0.5
Majority		1,107	43.5	+16.8
Turnout		2,544	25.7	+6.5
Labour hold		Swing	+8.4	

Stocksbridge
Party	Candidate	Votes	%	±%
Liberal Democrats	Martin Davis	2,182	75.6	+11.1
Labour	Alan Pears*	582	20.2	−9.4
Conservative	Morris Upton	122	4.2	−1.6
Majority		1,600	55.4	+20.4
Turnout		2,886	27.3	+2.7
Liberal Democrats gain from Labour		Swing	+10.2	

Alan Pears was previously elected as a Liberal Democrat councillor

Walkley
Party	Candidate	Votes	%	±%
Liberal Democrats	Jonathan Harston	2,444	54.6	−4.3
Labour	Terry Barrow*	1,663	37.2	+3.6
Green	Nicola Freeman	228	5.1	+0.4
Conservative	Gordan Millward	136	3.0	+0.2
Majority		781	17.5	−7.7
Turnout		4,471	32.5	+2.1
Liberal Democrats gain from Labour		Swing	-3.9	

== By-elections between 1999 and 2000 ==
Chapel Green by-election, 7 July 1999
Party	Candidate	Votes	%	±%
Liberal Democrats	Patricia Fox	1,711	53.2	−10.2
Labour		1,368	42.5	+10.6
Conservative		138	4.3	−0.4
Majority		343	10.7	−20.8
Turnout		3,217	18.1	−10.9
Liberal Democrats hold		Swing	-10.4	
