= 1967 Sheffield City Council election =

← 1966	11 May 1967	1968 →

All 81 councillors to Sheffield City Council
	First party	Second party	Third party
Party	Labour	Conservative	Independent
Seats won	41	39	1
Seat change	0	0	0
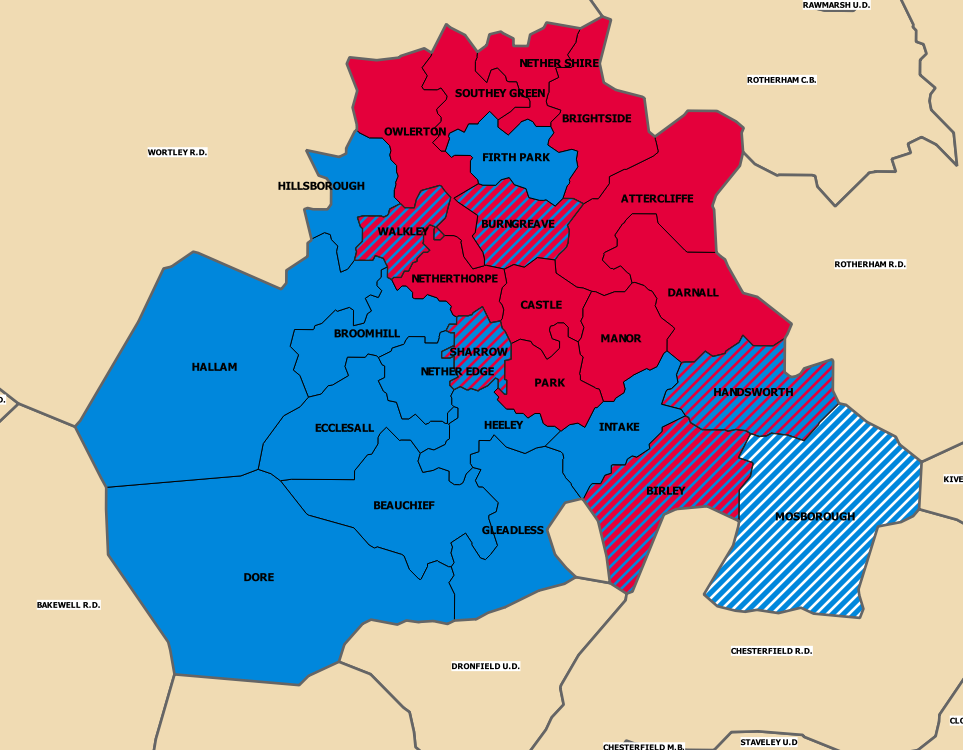
Majority party before election
Labour Party (UK)
Majority party after election
Labour Party (UK)

Elections to Sheffield Council were held on 11 May 1967. The entire council was up for election, following changes to the city borders, which extended into parts of Derbyshire, and extensive boundary changes and reorganisation of the wards. The wards Cathedral, Crookesmoor, Moor, Norton, Tinsley and Woodseats were abolished, with the new wards of Beauchief, Castle, Dore, Gleadless, Intake and Netherthorpe created. These, along with the inclusion of the Birley and Mosborough wards from neighbouring areas, brought the councillor total to 81 - up six from previous.

The election itself seen a historic night for the Conservatives, as they followed the national pattern of inflicting heavy losses onto the ruling Labour Party, coming as close to one seat away from seeing Labour lose their 33-strong majority with which they went into the election with. In Mosborough an Independent was elected on a platform of opposition to the takeover of the ward by Sheffield, whilst his counterpart in Birley finished last, but with a respectable 21%.

Overall turnout was a concern in this election, following the downward trend in turnout, resulting in the previous year's record low turnout of 22%. Hopes that this 'mini-election' - as it was dubbed - being the opportunity to decide on the council's control might draw a greater turnout than recent years, were fulfilled as turnout improved dramatically to 33.4%, the highest since 1961.

== Election result ==
Sheffield local election result 1967
Party	Seats	Gains	Losses	Net gain/loss	Seats %	Votes %	Votes	+/−
Labour	41	0	0	0	50.6	38.2	55,472	
Conservative	39	0	0	0	48.1	50.4	73,276	
Independent	1	0	0	0	1.2	1.9	1,542	
Communist	0	0	0	0	0.0	4.4	6,416	
Liberal	0	0	0	0	0.0	4.2	6,097	
National Front	0	0	0	0	0.0	0.8	1,239	

The result had the following consequences for the total number of seats on the Council after the elections:

Party	Previous council		New council	
Party	Cllr	Ald	Cllr	Ald
Labour	54	18	41	18
Conservatives	21	7	39	9
Independent	0	0	1	0
Communists	0	0	0	0
Liberals	0	0	0	0
National Front	0	0	0	0
Total	75	25	81	27
Total	100		108	
Working majority	33	11	1	9
Working majority	44		10	

== Ward results ==
Attercliffe
Party	Candidate	Votes	%	±%
Labour	William Robins	2,744	71.1	N/A
Labour	Norman Eldred	2,644		
Labour	Harry Firth	2,585		
Conservative	Eric Straw	1,115	28.9	N/A
Conservative	Eric Turner	1,080		
Conservative	Joan Willows	1,073		
Majority		1,629	42.2	N/A
Turnout		3,859	22.8	N/A
Labour win (new seat)				
Labour win (new seat)				
Labour win (new seat)				

Beauchief
Party	Candidate	Votes	%	±%
Conservative	Frank Adams	6,182	71.5	N/A
Conservative	George Beardshaw	6,178		
Conservative	Thomas Crewe	6,109		
Labour	Kenneth Morgan	2,463	28.5	N/A
Majority		3,719	43.0	N/A
Turnout		8,645	49.7	N/A
Conservative win (new seat)				
Conservative win (new seat)				
Conservative win (new seat)				

Birley
Party	Candidate	Votes	%	±%
Labour	Elsie Richardson	2,325	40.5	N/A
Conservative	Pauline Minns	2,197	38.3	N/A
Labour	Leonard Stones	2,196		
Labour	George Fisher	2,181		
Conservative	Myrtle Jackson	2,167		
Independent	Laurence Gillatt	1,211	21.1	N/A
Majority		29	2.2	N/A
Turnout		5,733	29.3	N/A
Labour win (new seat)				
Conservative win (new seat)				
Labour win (new seat)				

Brightside
Party	Candidate	Votes	%	±%
Labour	Arthur Longmore	2,019	51.4	N/A
Labour	Henry Sturrock	1,990		
Labour	George Wilson	1,573		
Conservative	Jennifer Levick	1,157	29.5	N/A
Conservative	Charles Hughes	1,077		
Conservative	Rhonda Beard	1,072		
National Front	Robert Taylor	387	9.8	N/A
Communist	Arthur Tingle	362	9.2	N/A
National Front	George Clark	316		
Majority		416	20.3	N/A
Turnout		3,925	25.6	N/A
Labour win (new seat)				
Labour win (new seat)				
Labour win (new seat)				

Broomhill
Party	Candidate	Votes	%	±%
Conservative	Peter Jackson	4,189	77.2	N/A
Conservative	Raymond Hadfield	4,175		
Conservative	Jack Peile	4,080		
Labour	Frances Gathercole	1,238	22.8	N/A
Majority		2,842	54.4	N/A
Turnout		5,427	33.9	N/A
Conservative win (new seat)				
Conservative win (new seat)				
Conservative win (new seat)				

Burngreave
Party	Candidate	Votes	%	±%
Labour	Reggie Ellis	1,876	46.2	N/A
Labour	John Pate	1,859		
Conservative	Jack Osborne	1,812	44.6	N/A
Conservative	Heather McKenzie	1,808		
Conservative	Pamela Bishop	1,740		
Labour	Harry Hall	1,726		
Communist	Jim Ashurst	373	9.2	N/A
Majority		51	1.6	N/A
Turnout		4,061	27.6	N/A
Labour win (new seat)				
Labour win (new seat)				
Conservative win (new seat)				

Castle
Party	Candidate	Votes	%	±%
Labour	Reg Munn	1,757	51.3	N/A
Labour	Peter Horton	1,703		
Labour	Roy Munn	1,673		
Conservative	Stanley Butler	1,235	36.1	N/A
Conservative	Simon Newall	1,180		
Conservative	Edwin Stephenson	1,124		
Communist	Edna Ashworth	430	12.5	N/A
Majority		438	15.2	N/A
Turnout		3,422	26.4	N/A
Labour win (new seat)				
Labour win (new seat)				
Labour win (new seat)				

Darnall
Party	Candidate	Votes	%	±%
Labour	Frederick Hattersley	2,426	55.7	N/A
Labour	William Owen	2,377		
Labour	Arnold Wood	2,355		
Conservative	T. H. Cooper	1,929	44.3	N/A
Conservative	Francis Brookes	1,910		
Conservative	Joseph Barber	1,903		
Majority		426	11.4	N/A
Turnout		4,355	27.6	N/A
Labour win (new seat)				
Labour win (new seat)				
Labour win (new seat)				

Dore
Party	Candidate	Votes	%	±%
Conservative	William Blake	5,115	77.8	N/A
Conservative	Thornton Lambert	5,044		
Conservative	Patricia Santhouse	5,004		
Labour	Philip Grisdale	1,459	22.2	N/A
Majority		3,545	55.6	N/A
Turnout		6,574	43.4	N/A
Conservative win (new seat)				
Conservative win (new seat)				
Conservative win (new seat)				

Ecclesall
Party	Candidate	Votes	%	±%
Conservative	John Neill	5,539	68.8	N/A
Conservative	Daniel O'Neill	5,347		
Conservative	Andrew Cook	5,252		
Liberal	Brian Bell	1,381	17.1	N/A
Labour	Leon Harris	1,132	14.0	N/A
Majority		3,871	51.7	N/A
Turnout		8,052	42.8	N/A
Conservative win (new seat)				
Conservative win (new seat)				
Conservative win (new seat)				

Firth Park
Party	Candidate	Votes	%	±%
Conservative	John Levick	2,224	39.9	N/A
Conservative	Andrew Oxley	2,131		
Labour	Tom Lowe	2,125	38.1	N/A
Conservative	Madge Kerton	2,099		
Labour	Charles Hayward	2,096		
Labour	Adrian Molloy	2,047		
Liberal	Francis Butler	696	12.5	N/A
Communist	Barry Bracken	531	9.5	N/A
Majority		35	1.8	N/A
Turnout		5,576	31.6	N/A
Conservative win (new seat)				
Conservative win (new seat)				
Labour win (new seat)				

Gleadless
Party	Candidate	Votes	%	±%
Conservative	Martyn Atkinson	4,065	55.4	N/A
Conservative	David Heslop	4,029		
Conservative	Charles Davison	3,832		
Labour	William Twigg	2,408	32.8	N/A
Labour	John Cornwell	2,386		
Labour	Alfred Wood	2,309		
Liberal	Colin Andrews	856	11.7	N/A
Majority		1,424	22.6	N/A
Turnout		7,329	50.5	N/A
Conservative win (new seat)				
Conservative win (new seat)				
Conservative win (new seat)				

Hallam
Party	Candidate	Votes	%	±%
Conservative	Alan Blake	4,866	78.4	N/A
Conservative	Gordon Wragg	4,824		
Conservative	Guy Walker	4,782		
Labour	Valerie Potts	1,339	21.6	N/A
Majority		3,443	56.8	N/A
Turnout		6,205	38.8	N/A
Conservative win (new seat)				
Conservative win (new seat)				
Conservative win (new seat)				

Handsworth
Party	Candidate	Votes	%	±%
Labour	Leonard Cope	2,273	50.6	N/A
Conservative	William Hyde	2,221	49.4	N/A
Conservative	George Hutchinson	2,188		
Labour	Alf Wild	2,031		
Labour	George Nicholls	1,973		
Conservative	Jack Kerton	1,968		
Majority		157	1.2	N/A
Turnout		4,494	33.3	N/A
Labour win (new seat)				
Conservative win (new seat)				
Conservative win (new seat)				

Heeley
Party	Candidate	Votes	%	±%
Conservative	James Garlick	3,915	48.8	N/A
Conservative	Peter Earl	3,908		
Conservative	Michael Swain	3,607		
Labour	Peter Jones	3,333	41.5	N/A
Labour	Eric Stephenson	2,935		
Labour	Norma Milne	2,855		
Communist	Robert Moody	776	9.7	N/A
Majority		274	7.2	N/A
Turnout		8,024	42.2	N/A
Conservative win (new seat)				
Conservative win (new seat)				
Conservative win (new seat)				

Hillsborough
Party	Candidate	Votes	%	±%
Conservative	Kenneth Arnold	4,394	59.5	N/A
Conservative	Constance Dodson	4,237		
Conservative	Irvine Patnick	4,230		
Labour	William Meade	2,984	40.4	N/A
Labour	Jack Watson	2,548		
Labour	Albert Morris	2,546		
Majority		1,246	19.1	N/A
Turnout		7,378	47.0	N/A
Conservative win (new seat)				
Conservative win (new seat)				
Conservative win (new seat)				

Intake
Party	Candidate	Votes	%	±%
Conservative	Dennis Johnson	2,945	51.9	N/A
Conservative	Marvyn Moore	2,873		
Conservative	Frank Woodger	2,831		
Labour	George Salmons	2,725	48.1	N/A
Labour	Joseph Albaya	2,689		
Labour	John Tomlinson	2,579		
Majority		106	3.9	N/A
Turnout		5,670	35.3	N/A
Conservative win (new seat)				
Conservative win (new seat)				
Conservative win (new seat)				

Manor
Party	Candidate	Votes	%	±%
Labour	George Armitage	2,104	45.8	N/A
Labour	Dora Fitter	2,059		
Labour	George Machin	1,673		
Conservative	Francis Smith	1,530	33.3	N/A
Conservative	David Newman	1,478		
Conservative	Malcolm Smith	1,418		
Communist	John Hukin	963	20.9	N/A
Majority		143	12.5	N/A
Turnout		4,597	26.8	N/A
Labour win (new seat)				
Labour win (new seat)				
Labour win (new seat)				

Mosborough
Party	Candidate	Votes	%	±%
Independent	Colin Neild	1,542	37.8	N/A
Labour	Mary Foulds	1,480	35.8	N/A
Labour	Dorothy Walton	1,459		
Labour	Ernest Bingham	1,398		
Conservative	Vivien Holmstrom	1,076	26.4	N/A
Conservative	Claude Toplis	974		
Majority		383	2.0	N/A
Turnout		4,077	30.8	N/A
Independent win (new seat)				
Labour win (new seat)				
Labour win (new seat)				

Nether Edge
Party	Candidate	Votes	%	±%
Conservative	Harry Mercer	4,229	65.1	N/A
Conservative	Ivan Harrington	4,219		
Conservative	Charles MacDonald	4,197		
Labour	James Pearson	1,203	18.5	N/A
Liberal	Michael Snook	1,063	16.4	N/A
Majority		2,994	46.6	N/A
Turnout		6,495	35.9	N/A
Conservative win (new seat)				
Conservative win (new seat)				
Conservative win (new seat)				

Nether Shire
Party	Candidate	Votes	%	±%
Labour	Charles Simms	2,165	37.7	N/A
Labour	Charles Moseley	2,113		
Labour	Fred Staton	2,032		
Conservative	Graham Cheetham	1,887	32.9	N/A
Conservative	Ida Crowther	1,825		
Conservative	Charles Hughes	1,556		
Liberal	Albert Hattersley	948	16.5	N/A
Communist	Ken Hattersley	741	12.9	N/A
Majority		145	4.8	N/A
Turnout		5,741	35.4	N/A
Labour win (new seat)				
Labour win (new seat)				
Labour win (new seat)				

Netherthorpe
Party	Candidate	Votes	%	±%
Labour	Enid Hattersley	1,820	47.3	N/A
Labour	Doris Mulhearn	1,744		
Labour	Marie Rodgers	1,707		
Conservative	John Banham	1,432	37.2	N/A
Conservative	Agnes Edeson	1,420		
Conservative	R. A. Stead	1,169		
Communist	Roy Barrett	598	15.5	N/A
Majority		275	10.1	N/A
Turnout		3,850	26.6	N/A
Labour win (new seat)				
Labour win (new seat)				
Labour win (new seat)				

Owlerton
Party	Candidate	Votes	%	±%
Labour	Roy Thwaites	2,173	46.5	N/A
Labour	Hector Bright	2,136		
Labour	John Yeardley	1,950		
Conservative	Nesta Bennett	1,426	30.5	N/A
Conservative	Joseph Griffiths	1,413		
Conservative	Harold Needham	1,344		
Communist	Dave Jeffrey	541	11.6	N/A
Liberal	R. Hurst	527	11.3	N/A
Majority		524	16.0	N/A
Turnout		4,667	25.6	N/A
Labour win (new seat)				
Labour win (new seat)				
Labour win (new seat)				

Park
Party	Candidate	Votes	%	±%
Labour	Joe Ashton	1,974	51.7	N/A
Labour	Charles Knowles	1,902		
Labour	Dennis Dunn	1,878		
Conservative	Raymond Brown	1,289	33.8	N/A
Conservative	June Harris	1,288		
Conservative	Ralph Davies	1,266		
Communist	Cyril Morton	553	14.5	N/A
Majority		589	17.9	N/A
Turnout		3,816	25.8	N/A
Labour win (new seat)				
Labour win (new seat)				
Labour win (new seat)				

Sharrow
Party	Candidate	Votes	%	±%
Conservative	Colin Barnsley	2,101	40.3	N/A
Conservative	David Pinder	2,056		
Labour	Vera Boyd	2,048	39.3	N/A
Labour	Annie Britton	2,016		
Conservative	John Goodram	2,000		
Labour	Godfrey Hill	1,955		
Liberal	Dennis Boothroyd	626	12.0	N/A
National Front	Barrie Bolton	437	8.4	N/A
National Front	Alan Holmes	225		
Majority		40	1.0	N/A
Turnout		5,212	37.5	N/A
Conservative win (new seat)				
Conservative win (new seat)				
Labour win (new seat)				

Southey Green
Party	Candidate	Votes	%	±%
Labour	Arnold Crosby	1,798	52.1	N/A
Labour	Winifred Golding	1,730		
Labour	Francis O'Shaughnessy	1,666		
Conservative	Ian Disley	1,104	32.0	N/A
Conservative	Leonard Scott	991		
Conservative	Joyce Kenning	965		
Communist	Raymond Southall	548	15.9	N/A
Majority		562	20.1	N/A
Turnout		3,450	21.6	N/A
Labour win (new seat)				
Labour win (new seat)				
Labour win (new seat)				

Walkley
Party	Candidate	Votes	%	±%
Labour	Jack Towns	2,102	45.5	N/A
Conservative	Leslie Hesp	2,102	45.5	N/A
Labour	Maurice Roberts	2,101		
Labour	Bernard Kidd	2,046		
Conservative	David Lister	1,987		
Conservative	Joyce Palmer	1,974		
National Front	Geoffrey Wilding	415	9.0	N/A
National Front	Michael Calton	332		
Majority		56	0.0	N/A
Turnout		4,619	28.8	N/A
Labour win (new seat)				
Conservative win (new seat)				
Labour win (new seat)				

== By-elections between 1967 and 1968 ==
Broomhill By-election 29 June 1967
Party	Candidate	Votes	%	±%
Conservative	Myrtle Jackson	1,833	74.1	−3.1
Conservative	Graham Cheetham	1,772		
Liberal	J. Garb	419	16.9	+16.9
National Front	Alan Holmes	220	8.9	+8.9
Majority		1,353	57.2	+2.8
Turnout		2,472	18.3	−15.6
Conservative hold		Swing		
Conservative hold		Swing	-10.0	

Ecclesall By-election 29 June 1967
Party	Candidate	Votes	%	±%
Conservative	Agnes Edeson	2,250	77.1	+8.3
Liberal	Brian Bell	521	17.9	+0.8
Labour	Adrian Molloy	145	5.0	−9.0
Majority		1,729	59.2	+7.6
Turnout		2,916	20.0	−22.8
Conservative hold		Swing	+3.8	

Hillsborough By-election 29 June 1967
Party	Candidate	Votes	%	±%
Conservative	B. Lee	2,716	57.7	−1.8
Labour	William Meade	1,862	39.5	−0.9
?	P. Hurst	80	1.7	+1.7
Independent	Laurence Gillat	50	1.0	+1.0
Majority		854	18.2	−0.9
Turnout		4,708	31.7	−15.3
Conservative hold		Swing	-0.4	
