= 1963 Sheffield City Council election =

← 1962	9 May 1963	1964 →

27 councillors to Sheffield City Council
	First party	Second party
Party	Labour	Conservative
Seats won	21	6
Seat change	▲5	▼4
Majority party before election
Labour Party (UK)
Majority party after election
Labour Party (UK)

The 1963 Sheffield City Council election was held on 9 May 1963, with one third up for vote and two vacancies in Attercliffe and Tinsley. The election, boasting a record field of candidates, seen Labour win back all their 1960 losses as well as gaining Hillsborough. The Ratepayers Association's failure to contest these elections meant their sole representation on the council, as one of the Firth Park councillors, was lost. Overall turnout was unchanged from the previous years, at 31%.

== Election result ==
Sheffield local election result 1963
Party	Seats	Gains	Losses	Net gain/loss	Seats %	Votes %	Votes	+/−
Labour	21	5	0	+5	77.8	52.7	58,335	+6.1
Conservative	6	0	4	-4	22.2	33.7	37,341	-3.0
Liberal	0	0	0	0	0.0	10.3	11,436	-1.4
Communist	0	0	0	0	0.0	1.8	2,065	-0.2
Union Movement	0	0	0	0	0.0	1.3	1,501	+0.1

The result had the following consequences for the total number of seats on the Council after the elections:

Party	Previous council		New council	
Party	Cllr	Ald	Cllr	Ald
Labour	50	17	55	18
Conservatives	24	8	20	7
Liberals	0	0	0	0
Communist	0	0	0	0
Union Movement	0	0	0	0
Ratepayers	1	0	0	0
Total	75	25	75	25
Total	100		100	
Working majority	25	9	35	11
Working majority	34		46	

== Ward results ==
Attercliffe
Party	Candidate	Votes	%	±%
Labour	G. Goodenough	1,970	71.0	−7.1
Labour	William Twigg	1,554		
Liberal	A. Oxby	337	12.1	+12.1
Conservative	William Keen	321	11.6	−1.3
Conservative	Ruth Hawson	283		
Liberal	Kathleen Hinchcliffe	255		
Union Movement	Robert Taylor	147	5.3	−3.7
Majority		1,217	59.4	−5.8
Turnout		2,775	19.9	+1.6
Labour hold		Swing		
Labour hold		Swing	-9.6	

Brightside
Party	Candidate	Votes	%	±%
Labour	Henry Sturrock	1,865	78.1	+6.0
Communist	Henry Hardwick	305	12.8	+3.3
Union Movement	Peter Bashforth	217	9.1	+3.9
Majority		1,560	65.3	+6.4
Turnout		2,387	20.9	−1.0
Labour hold		Swing	+1.3	

Broomhill
Party	Candidate	Votes	%	±%
Conservative	Peter Jackson	2,880	59.7	−14.7
Labour	J. Birkhead	1,015	21.0	−4.5
Liberal	Emily Holt	929	19.2	+19.2
Majority		1,865	38.6	−10.2
Turnout		4,824	32.6	+3.5
Conservative hold		Swing	-5.1	

Burngreave
Party	Candidate	Votes	%	±%
Labour	J. Thorpe	2,368	70.8	+6.5
Conservative	Frank Adams	974	29.1	−6.5
Majority		1,394	41.7	+13.0
Turnout		3,342	31.7	+1.7
Labour hold		Swing	+6.5	

Cathedral
Party	Candidate	Votes	%	±%
Labour	Enid Hattersley	2,213	87.7	+9.2
Union Movement	John Wood	309	12.2	+12.2
Majority		1,904	75.5	+18.4
Turnout		2,522	27.5	−0.1
Labour hold		Swing	-1.5	

Crookesmoor
Party	Candidate	Votes	%	±%
Labour	Roy Hattersley	2,117	60.3	−4.5
Conservative	Ivan Harrington	914	26.0	−5.3
Liberal	Alan Thompson	374	10.6	+10.6
Communist	Nellie Connole	104	2.9	−0.8
Majority		1,203	34.3	+0.9
Turnout		3,509	33.2	−2.3
Labour hold		Swing	+0.4	

Darnall
Party	Candidate	Votes	%	±%
Labour	C. Price	2,835	55.9	+9.3
Conservative	Noel Taylor	1,032	20.3	−4.0
Liberal	Joseph Hinchcliffe	850	16.8	−2.8
Communist	Alan Ecclestone	351	6.9	+0.8
Majority		1,803	35.6	+13.3
Turnout		5,068	27.2	+0.2
Labour hold		Swing	+6.6	

Ecclesall
Party	Candidate	Votes	%	±%
Conservative	John Neill	4,739	82.4	−5.2
Labour	Leon Harris	1,009	17.5	+5.2
Majority		3,730	64.9	−10.3
Turnout		5,748	34.8	−0.9
Conservative hold		Swing	-5.2	

Firth Park
Party	Candidate	Votes	%	±%
Labour	Charles Hayward	2,601	63.3	+10.9
Conservative	Ida Crowther	1,363	33.2	+33.2
Union Movement	H. Jones	144	3.5	+0.4
Majority		1,238	30.1	+22.1
Turnout		4,108	31.8	−0.5
Labour gain from Ratepayers		Swing	-11.1	

Hallam
Party	Candidate	Votes	%	±%
Conservative	Alan Blake	3,840	56.1	+1.6
Labour	Kenneth Brack	1,727	25.2	+7.8
Liberal	George Harry Manley	1,282	18.7	−9.4
Majority		2,113	30.8	+4.5
Turnout		6,849	40.8	+0.9
Conservative hold		Swing	-3.1	

Handsworth
Party	Candidate	Votes	%	±%
Labour	George Salmons	3,730	58.4	+6.5
Conservative	Charles Macdonald	1,503	23.5	−4.2
Liberal	Ken Peace	1,155	18.1	−2.4
Majority		2,227	34.8	+10.7
Turnout		6,388	31.8	−1.6
Labour hold		Swing	+5.3	

Heeley
Party	Candidate	Votes	%	±%
Labour	Peter Jones	2,889	55.0	+6.3
Conservative	John Barraclough	1,427	27.1	−3.7
Liberal	Graham Oxley	799	15.2	−0.4
Communist	Joe Stevenson	140	2.6	−0.5
Majority		1,462	27.8	+10.0
Turnout		5,255	43.4	+1.1
Labour gain from Conservative		Swing	+5.0	

Hillsborough
Party	Candidate	Votes	%	±%
Labour	William Meade	2,971	44.6	+10.2
Conservative	Connie Dodson	2,244	33.7	−2.0
Liberal	Alan Crapper	1,437	21.6	−8.2
Majority		727	10.9	+9.6
Turnout		6,652	48.6	+3.3
Labour gain from Conservative		Swing	+6.1	

Manor
Party	Candidate	Votes	%	±%
Labour	C. John	2,983	79.1	−8.4
Liberal	David Turner	487	12.9	+12.9
Communist	John Hukin	299	7.9	−4.5
Majority		2,496	66.2	−8.9
Turnout		3,769	24.0	+4.8
Labour hold		Swing	-10.6	

Moor
Party	Candidate	Votes	%	±%
Labour	Roy Munn	2,286	64.9	+10.2
Conservative	H. Maw	1,152	32.7	+6.9
Union Movement	P. Wild	81	2.3	−1.8
Majority		1,134	32.2	+3.4
Turnout		3,519	34.2	+1.5
Labour gain from Conservative		Swing	+1.6	

Nether Edge
Party	Candidate	Votes	%	±%
Conservative	Harry Mercer	2,178	48.5	−0.5
Labour	Roy Thwaites	1,227	27.3	+1.6
Liberal	Dennis Boothroyd	1,080	24.1	−1.2
Majority		951	21.2	−2.1
Turnout		4,485	35.9	−2.5
Conservative hold		Swing	-1.0	

Nether Shire
Party	Candidate	Votes	%	±%
Labour	Charles Moseley	2,728	91.7	+37.7
Communist	Howard Hill	248	8.3	+3.2
Majority		2,480	83.3	+51.0
Turnout		2,976	22.1	−9.8
Labour hold		Swing	+17.2	

Norton
Party	Candidate	Votes	%	±%
National Liberal	E. Tindall	5,099	54.6	−1.7
Labour	Frank Hooley	3,195	34.2	+4.9
Liberal	Gordon Wallace	1,041	11.1	−3.2
Majority		1,904	20.4	−6.7
Turnout		9,335	37.6	+0.4
National Liberal hold		Swing	-3.3	

Owlerton
Party	Candidate	Votes	%	±%
Labour	W. Watson	2,262	65.1	+16.2
Conservative	Horace Bestall	926	26.6	+0.8
Communist	Dave Jeffery	195	5.6	+1.8
Union Movement	J. Judge	93	2.7	+0.6
Majority		1,336	38.4	+15.4
Turnout		3,476	30.2	−2.4
Labour hold		Swing	+7.7	

Park
Party	Candidate	Votes	%	±%
Labour	Norman Goodchild	2,404	83.7	+16.8
Conservative	Raymond Hadfield	468	16.3	−5.0
Majority		1,936	67.4	+21.7
Turnout		2,872	27.0	−0.6
Labour hold		Swing	+10.9	

Sharrow
Party	Candidate	Votes	%	±%
Labour	P. Ryder	2,101	53.4	+8.1
Conservative	Alexander Leitch	1,569	39.9	+0.8
Union Movement	Barbara Wood	265	6.7	+1.9
Majority		532	13.5	+7.3
Turnout		3,935	38.2	+2.0
Labour hold		Swing	+3.6	

Southey Green
Party	Candidate	Votes	%	±%
Labour	Arnold Crosby	3,390	88.9	+13.0
Communist	Jim Hudson	423	11.1	+3.9
Majority		2,967	77.8	+18.8
Turnout		3,813	22.4	−1.4
Labour gain from Conservative		Swing	+4.5	

Tinsley
Party	Candidate	Votes	%	±%
Labour	Tom Lowe	2,193	68.9	−10.4
Labour	Tom Cruise	2,084		
Liberal	W. Hartill Jr.	622	19.5	+19.5
Conservative	Patricia Santhouse	367	11.5	−9.1
Liberal	Joyce Peace	288		
Majority		1,462	49.4	−9.3
Turnout		3,182	31.3	+4.8
Labour hold		Swing		
Labour hold		Swing	-14.9	

Walkley
Party	Candidate	Votes	%	±%
Labour	Jack Towns	2,244	58.4	−0.0
Conservative	W. Nowill	1,353	35.2	−0.7
Union Movement	Francis Hamley	245	6.4	+0.7
Majority		891	23.2	+0.6
Turnout		3,842	31.3	+3.0
Labour hold		Swing	+0.3	

Woodseats
Party	Candidate	Votes	%	±%
Conservative	Robert Lawther	2,992	49.5	−4.1
Labour	Dora Fitter	2,012	33.3	+3.1
Liberal	Colin Wood	1,043	17.2	+1.0
Majority		980	16.2	−7.2
Turnout		6,047	38.7	+0.5
Conservative hold		Swing	-3.6	
