= 1969 Sheffield City Council election =

← 1968	8 May 1969	1970 →

28 councillors to Sheffield City Council
	First party	Second party	Third party
Party	Labour	Conservative	Liberal
Seats won	18	10	0
Seat change	▲5	▼5	0
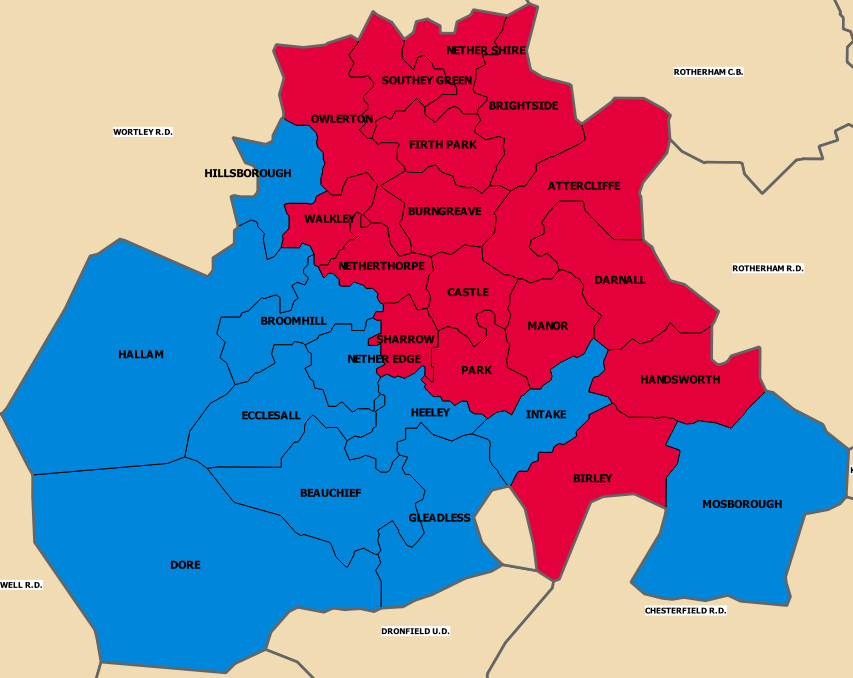
Majority party before election
Conservative Party (UK)
Majority party after election
Labour Party (UK)

The 1969 Sheffield City Council elections were held on 8 May 1969, with one third of the council - plus a double vacancy in Park - up for election. The previous year's historic win by the Conservatives, and their gaining control of the council was ended with these elections, with Labour successfully holding or gaining back seats in wards they lost in the last year's defeat. The previous year's substantial Tory leads in vote figures and seat numbers belied how narrowly won those numerous gains were, with even a tiny swing to Labour destined to return them.

Labour's win and regaining control of the council was in sharp contrast to the national picture, which seen a repeat of the preceding years' heavy losses to the Conservatives with further losses of their heartlands to Tory control. Sheffield joined Stoke as the only cities left controlled by Labour, with last year's survivor Hull falling this year. Nationally Labour managed just 23 gains, with Sheffield accounting for over a fifth of them.

Given this environment, the Labour response was naturally overjoyed; the Sheffield Brightside MP Eddie Griffiths reacted "I literally had tears in my eyes when I heard the results. I was more excited about these results than by my own election". The Labour group's leader Ald Ron Ironmonger attributed this to their campaigning effort and the electorate voting on a local mindset "[we've] struggled so hard for this. We took this really seriously - we haven't fought a campaign like this for years. I think the victory is due to the good sense of the Sheffield people, and I am proud of them tonight. They have judged the election on the city's own affairs as we asked them to. We are certainly wiser men after a year in opposition. There is no doubt about that."

The Conservative grouping leader Ald Harrold Hebblethwaite responded "Obviously I am very disappointed at this result and I find it quite surprising, though one has always understood that Sheffield is a city on its own, and can never be relied on to follow a national trend. The great pity of it is that Walkley we certainly lost due to the intervention of an Independent, and Sharrow by a Liberal intervention - though obviously we cannot say that as regards Firth Park and Handsworth".

Hebblethwaite accepted that the Rent Rebate scheme had played a large part in last year's results, but qualified "nevertheless I am certain the public have been somewhat confused about the issues this year. Twelve months is not enough time for any party to settle down in control and get its policies under way". Of such policies Labour were to reintroduce the closed-shop clause in Corporation employment which the Tories had dropped and accept the 30 places at Sheffield Girl's High School, which were now too late to reverse.

Overall turnout was up narrowly on the previous year's, to 33.2%

== Election result ==
Sheffield local election result 1969
Party	Seats	Gains	Losses	Net gain/loss	Seats %	Votes %	Votes	+/−
Labour	18	5	0	+5	64.3	42.4	52,082	+6.4
Conservative	10	0	5	-5	35.7	52.8	64,862	-4.6
Liberal	0	0	0	0	0.0	1.7	2,092	-0.4
Communist	0	0	0	0	0.0	1.7	2,065	-0.7
Other	0	0	0	0	0.0	1.4	1,800	-0.7

The result had the following consequences for the total number of seats on the Council after the elections:

Party	Previous council		New council	
Party	Cllr	Ald	Cllr	Ald
Labour	34	18	39	18
Conservatives	47	9	42	9
Liberals	0	0	0	0
Communists	0	0	0	0
Total	81	27	81	27
Total	108		108	
Working majority	13	-9	-3	9
Working majority	4		6	

== Ward results ==
Attercliffe
Party	Candidate	Votes	%	±%
Labour	Norman Eldred	2,089	71.0	+4.6
Conservative	Harold Mellor	852	29.0	−4.6
Majority		1,237	42.0	+9.2
Turnout		2,941	19.0	−2.2
Labour hold		Swing	+4.6	

Beauchief
Party	Candidate	Votes	%	±%
Conservative	C. White	6,001	82.2	−0.7
Labour	Annie Britton	1,296	17.7	+0.7
Majority		4,705	64.5	−1.4
Turnout		7,297	50.6	−2.5
Conservative hold		Swing	-0.7	

Birley
Party	Candidate	Votes	%	±%
Labour	John Yeardley	2,438	49.7	+8.7
Conservative	Pauline Minns	2,211	45.1	−9.0
Independent	Laurence Gillatt	251	5.2	+0.4
Majority		227	4.6	−8.4
Turnout		4,900	32.3	+1.1
Labour gain from Conservative		Swing	+8.8	

Brightside
Party	Candidate	Votes	%	±%
Labour	Henry Sturrock	1,966	55.2	+2.5
Conservative	Kathleene Moore	1,319	37.0	+0.8
	J. Robinson	165	4.6	+4.6
Independent Communist	R. Wilkinson	109	3.0	+3.0
Majority		647	18.2	+1.6
Turnout		3,559	27.6	+0.5
Labour hold		Swing	+0.8	

Broomhill
Party	Candidate	Votes	%	±%
Conservative	A. Smith	3,154	77.3	+11.0
Labour	R. Thackeray	690	16.9	−1.7
	D. Morris	233	5.8	+5.8
Majority		2,464	60.4	+12.7
Turnout		4,077	31.1	−2.0
Conservative hold		Swing	+6.3	

Burngreave
Party	Candidate	Votes	%	±%
Labour	John Pate	2,346	55.9	+13.6
Conservative	Cliff Godber	1,695	40.4	−9.3
Communist	A. March	153	3.6	−1.0
Majority		651	15.5	+8.1
Turnout		4,194	31.6	+4.3
Labour hold		Swing	+11.4	

Castle
Party	Candidate	Votes	%	±%
Labour	Peter Horton	2,088	67.5	+13.5
Conservative	L. Chambers	788	25.5	−8.5
Communist	Edna Ashworth	216	7.0	+1.6
Majority		1,300	42.0	+22.1
Turnout		3,092	27.5	−1.4
Labour hold		Swing	+11.0	

Darnall
Party	Candidate	Votes	%	±%
Labour	William Owen	2,902	59.0	+9.9
Conservative	Roger Outram	2,014	41.0	−9.9
Majority		888	18.0	+16.3
Turnout		4,916	32.8	+2.4
Labour hold		Swing	+9.9	

Dore
Party	Candidate	Votes	%	±%
Conservative	Thornton Lambert	4,983	79.7	−0.6
Labour	Marie Rodgers	1,272	20.3	+0.6
Majority		3,711	59.4	−1.2
Turnout		6,255	47.7	−1.0
Conservative hold		Swing	-0.6	

Ecclesall
Party	Candidate	Votes	%	±%
Conservative	Edith Edeson	4,341	83.9	+5.7
Labour	James Pearson	835	16.1	+5.9
Majority		3,506	67.7	−0.1
Turnout		5,176	35.5	−7.2
Conservative hold		Swing	-0.1	

Firth Park
Party	Candidate	Votes	%	±%
Labour	Albert Morris	2,147	43.7	+4.4
Conservative	Andrew Oxley	1,944	39.5	−6.5
Liberal	Francis Butler	670	13.6	+3.6
Communist	Barry Bracken	155	3.1	−1.5
Majority		203	4.1	−2.6
Turnout		4,916	34.5	+1.7
Labour gain from Conservative		Swing	+5.4	

Gleadless
Party	Candidate	Votes	%	±%
Conservative	David Heslop	3,898	57.1	−6.7
Labour	Phillip Grisdale	2,347	34.8	+3.9
Liberal	Dennis Boothroyd	581	8.5	+2.7
Majority		1,551	22.7	−10.6
Turnout		6,826	44.5	−2.0
Conservative hold		Swing	-5.3	

Hallam
Party	Candidate	Votes	%	±%
Conservative	Gordon Wragg	3,755	70.4	−9.1
Labour	Harry Hall	954	17.9	−2.5
Liberal	Jean Mason	622	11.7	+11.7
Majority		2,801	52.5	−6.6
Turnout		5,331	38.5	−1.0
Conservative hold		Swing	-3.3	

Handsworth
Party	Candidate	Votes	%	±%
Labour	George Nicholls	2,563	55.8	+6.2
Conservative	Jack Kerton	2,031	44.2	−6.2
Majority		532	11.6	+10.6
Turnout		4,594	36.1	+3.4
Labour gain from Conservative		Swing	+6.2	

Heeley
Party	Candidate	Votes	%	±%
Conservative	Peter Earl	3,377	56.4	−1.3
Labour	Alfred Wood	2,193	36.7	+0.5
Communist	J. Turton	411	6.9	+0.8
Majority		1,184	19.8	−1.8
Turnout		5,981	37.3	−3.2
Conservative hold		Swing	-0.9	

Hillsborough
Party	Candidate	Votes	%	±%
Conservative	Constance Dodson	3,500	64.7	−3.7
Labour	William Meade	1,912	35.3	+3.7
Majority		1,588	29.3	−7.3
Turnout		5,412	36.8	−6.0
Conservative hold		Swing	-3.6	

Intake
Party	Candidate	Votes	%	±%
Conservative	Marvyn Moore	2,613	52.9	−4.4
Labour	Arnold Wood	2,329	47.1	+4.4
Majority		284	5.7	−8.7
Turnout		4,942	31.3	−1.3
Conservative hold		Swing	-4.4	

Manor
Party	Candidate	Votes	%	±%
Labour	Dora Fitter	2,027	59.6	+10.3
Conservative	D. Russell	1,156	34.0	−5.0
Communist	John Hukin	219	6.4	−5.3
Majority		871	25.6	+15.2
Turnout		3,402	24.8	−1.0
Labour hold		Swing	+7.6	

Mosborough
Party	Candidate	Votes	%	±%
Labour	Mary Foulds	2,078	62.8	+13.4
Conservative	Eric Vawser	1,230	37.2	−13.4
Majority		848	25.6	+24.5
Turnout		3,308	38.0	+4.4
Labour hold		Swing	+13.4	

Nether Edge
Party	Candidate	Votes	%	±%
Conservative	Ivan Harrington	4,085	79.9	−2.9
Labour	Charlotte Ellis	1,029	20.1	+2.9
Majority		3,056	59.7	−5.8
Turnout		5,114	36.8	−3.0
Conservative hold		Swing	-2.9	

Nether Shire
Party	Candidate	Votes	%	±%
Labour	Charles Moseley	2,221	52.1	+12.6
Conservative	Hazel Black	1,766	41.4	+4.7
Communist	Ken Hattersley	278	6.5	+1.1
Majority		455	10.7	+7.9
Turnout		4,265	34.5	−4.9
Labour hold		Swing	+3.9	

Netherthorpe
Party	Candidate	Votes	%	±%
Labour	Doris Mulhearn	1,994	57.6	+11.8
Conservative	E. Dawson	1,309	37.8	−8.0
Communist	Roy Barrett	156	4.5	−3.8
Majority		685	19.8	+19.7
Turnout		3,459	31.5	+2.6
Labour hold		Swing	+9.9	

Owlerton
Party	Candidate	Votes	%	±%
Labour	Jack Watson	2,257	62.0	+18.4
Conservative	Zena Thompson	1,385	38.0	−7.8
Majority		872	23.9	+21.7
Turnout		3,642	25.2	+2.7
Labour hold		Swing	+13.1	

Park
Party	Candidate	Votes	%	±%
Labour	Charles Knowles	2,466	64.7	+17.7
Labour	Peter Jones	2,458		
Conservative	June Harris	1,091	28.6	−2.5
Conservative	Peter Huddart	1,021		
Communist	Cyril Morton	253	6.6	+1.9
Majority		1,375	36.1	+20.3
Turnout		3,810	23.2	−1.6
Labour hold		Swing		
Labour hold		Swing	+10.1	

Sharrow
Party	Candidate	Votes	%	±%
Labour	Ethal Evans	1,991	47.9	+3.8
Conservative	David Pinder	1,824	43.8	−7.7
Liberal	Colin Wood	219	5.3	+5.3
National Front	George Clark	125	3.0	−1.5
Majority		167	4.0	−3.5
Turnout		4,159	37.2	−2.1
Labour gain from Conservative		Swing	+5.7	

Southey Green
Party	Candidate	Votes	%	±%
Labour	Winifred Golding	1,866	65.2	+13.1
Conservative	Charles Hughes	772	27.0	−7.4
Communist	Gordon Ashberry	224	7.8	−5.7
Majority		1,094	38.2	+20.5
Turnout		2,862	21.2	+0.2
Labour hold		Swing	+10.2	

Walkley
Party	Candidate	Votes	%	±%
Labour	Bernard Kidd	1,786	39.9	−0.8
Conservative	Leslie Hesp	1,768	39.5	−9.3
	G. Green	773	17.3	+17.3
National Front	Alan Holmes	144	3.2	−2.1
Majority		18	0.4	−7.7
Turnout		4,471	31.5	+0.0
Labour gain from Conservative		Swing	+4.2	
