= 1962 Sheffield City Council election =

Local English political election in 1962

← 1961	10 May 1962	1963 →

27 councillors to Sheffield City Council
	First party	Second party
Party	Labour	Conservative
Seats won	20	7
Seat change	0	0
Majority party before election
Labour Party (UK)
Majority party after election
Labour Party (UK)

Sheffield's 1962 Municipal elections were held on 10 May 1962. One-third of the council and vacancies in Moor and Park were up for election. Previous to this election, there had been two by-elections in June for Hallam and Woodseats, which the Conservatives safely held. The election saw a record number of 84 candidates, with the Liberals contesting half of the city's wards and the Communists and the Union Movement over a third. The increased presence of the Liberals helped them to triple their vote on the previous year's, and nearly see to a gain in Hillsborough. There were, however, no seats exchanged for the second year running. Turnout was 31.8%, down slightly on the previous year.

== Election result ==
Sheffield local election result 1962
Party	Seats	Gains	Losses	Net gain/loss	Seats %	Votes %	Votes	+/−
Labour	20	0	0	0	74.1	46.6	51,664	-3.7
Conservative and Liberal Unionist	7	0	0	0	25.9	36.7	40,614	-5.8
Liberal	0	0	0	0	0.0	11.7	12,913	+8.8
Communist	0	0	0	0	0.0	2.0	2,256	+0.2
Ratepayers Association	0	0	0	0	0.0	1.7	1,860	-0.2
Union Movement	0	0	0	0	0.0	1.2	1,374	+1.0
Municipal Reform	0	0	0	0	0.0	0.1	93	-0.2

The result had the following consequences for the total number of seats on the Council after the elections:

Party	Previous council		New council	
Party	Cllr	Ald	Cllr	Ald
Labour	50	17	50	17
Conservative-Liberals	24	8	24	8
Ratepayers	1	0	1	0
Liberals	0	0	0	0
Communist	0	0	0	0
Union Movement	0	0	0	0
Municipal Reform	0	0	0	0
Total	75	25	75	25
Total	100		100	
Working majority	25	9	25	9
Working majority	34		34	

== Ward results ==
Attercliffe
Party	Candidate	Votes	%	±%
Labour	William Robins	1,986	78.1	+2.0
Conservative and Liberal Unionist	Ruth Hawson	327	12.8	−11.0
Union Movement	Robert Taylor	229	9.0	+9.0
Majority		1,659	65.3	+13.0
Turnout		2,542	18.2	+1.3
Labour hold		Swing	+6.5	

Brightside
Party	Candidate	Votes	%	±%
Labour	Arthur Longmore	1,822	72.1	−9.5
Conservative and Liberal Unionist	Roger Cooke	334	13.2	−5.1
Communist	Harry Hardwick	238	9.4	+9.4
Union Movement	Peter Bashforth	131	5.2	+5.2
Majority		1,488	58.9	−4.4
Turnout		2,525	21.9	+1.4
Labour hold		Swing	-2.2	

Broomhill
Party	Candidate	Votes	%	±%
Conservative and Liberal Unionist	Ruben Viner	3,261	74.4	−4.9
Labour	R. Day	1,121	25.6	+4.9
Majority		2,140	48.8	−9.8
Turnout		4,382	29.1	+0.1
Conservative and Liberal Unionist hold		Swing	-4.9	

Burngreave
Party	Candidate	Votes	%	±%
Labour	John Pate	1,946	64.3	−0.9
Conservative and Liberal Unionist	Frank Adams	1,078	35.6	+0.9
Majority		868	28.7	−1.8
Turnout		3,024	30.0	+3.3
Labour hold		Swing	-0.9	

Cathedral
Party	Candidate	Votes	%	±%
Labour	Doris Mulhearn	1,963	78.5	−0.8
Conservative and Liberal Unionist	M. Shirtcliffe	536	21.4	+0.8
Majority		1,427	57.1	−1.5
Turnout		2,499	27.5	+0.3
Labour hold		Swing	-0.8	

Crookesmoor
Party	Candidate	Votes	%	±%
Labour	Harold Lambert	2,522	64.8	+7.0
Conservative and Liberal Unionist	Ivan Harrington	1,222	31.4	−4.2
Communist	Nellie Connole	148	3.8	−2.8
Majority		1,300	33.4	+11.2
Turnout		3,892	35.5	−0.2
Labour hold		Swing	+5.6	

Darnall
Party	Candidate	Votes	%	±%
Labour	Arnold Wood	2,398	46.6	−14.3
Conservative and Liberal Unionist	Noel Taylor	1,253	24.4	−5.7
Liberal	Barrie Dobson	1,005	19.5	+19.5
Communist	Alan Ecclestone	313	6.1	−2.9
Union Movement	Derek King	172	3.3	+3.3
Majority		1,145	22.3	−8.6
Turnout		5,141	27.1	+1.7
Labour hold		Swing	-4.3	

Ecclesall
Party	Candidate	Votes	%	±%
Conservative and Liberal Unionist	Harold Hebblethwaite	5,198	87.6	+0.8
Labour	Roy Munn	734	12.4	−0.8
Majority		4,464	75.2	+1.6
Turnout		5,932	35.7	+2.4
Conservative and Liberal Unionist hold		Swing	+0.8	

Firth Park
Party	Candidate	Votes	%	±%
Labour	H. Molloy	2,196	52.4	+0.3
Ratepayers Association	G. Windle	1,860	44.4	−3.5
Union Movement	Roy Crookes	131	3.1	+3.1
Majority		336	8.0	+3.9
Turnout		4,187	32.4	−1.5
Labour hold		Swing	+1.9	

Hallam
Party	Candidate	Votes	%	±%
Conservative and Liberal Unionist	Gordon Wragg	3,595	54.4	−18.5
Liberal	Robert Jackson	1,859	28.1	+28.1
Labour	J. Birkhead	1,148	17.4	−9.6
Majority		1,736	26.3	−19.7
Turnout		6,602	39.9	+3.5
Conservative and Liberal Unionist hold		Swing	-23.3	

Handsworth
Party	Candidate	Votes	%	±%
Labour	Leonard Cope	3,374	51.8	−6.2
Conservative and Liberal Unionist	Frederick Naylor	1,804	27.7	−14.3
Liberal	Kenneth Peace	1,336	20.5	+20.5
Majority		1,570	24.1	+8.1
Turnout		6,514	33.4	−0.5
Labour hold		Swing	+4.0	

Heeley
Party	Candidate	Votes	%	±%
Labour	Martha Strafford	2,505	48.6	−0.7
Conservative and Liberal Unionist	John Barraclough	1,590	30.9	−4.3
Liberal	Graham Oxley	803	15.6	+0.1
Communist	John Chapman	164	3.2	+3.2
Union Movement	John Wood	89	1.7	+1.7
Majority		915	17.7	+3.6
Turnout		5,151	42.3	−1.8
Labour hold		Swing	+1.8	

Hillsborough
Party	Candidate	Votes	%	±%
Conservative and Liberal Unionist	Claude Toplis	2,224	35.7	−23.1
Labour	William Meade	2,141	34.4	−6.7
Liberal	Alan Crapper	1,854	29.8	+29.8
Majority		83	1.3	−16.4
Turnout		6,219	45.3	+6.9
Conservative and Liberal Unionist hold		Swing	-8.2	

Manor
Party	Candidate	Votes	%	±%
Labour	George Armitage	2,670	87.6	+10.1
Communist	John Hukin	379	12.4	+6.1
Majority		2,291	75.1	+13.9
Turnout		3,049	19.2	−10.0
Labour hold		Swing	+2.0	

Moor
Party	Candidate	Votes	%	±%
Labour	Reg Munn	2,010	54.7	−8.5
Labour	Peter Horton	1,831		
Conservative and Liberal Unionist	D. Sheath	950	25.8	−10.9
Conservative and Liberal Unionist	Raymond Hadfield	862		
Liberal	I. Greenfield	560	15.2	+15.2
Liberal	A. Greenfield	539		
Union Movement	Charles Hyles	153	4.2	+4.2
Majority		1,060	28.8	+2.3
Turnout		3,673	32.7	+0.4
Labour hold		Swing		
Labour hold		Swing	+1.2	

Nether Edge
Party	Candidate	Votes	%	±%
Conservative and Liberal Unionist	Dane Clissold	2,352	49.0	−10.0
Labour	Kenneth Brack	1,232	25.7	+0.6
Liberal	Dennis Boothroyd	1,211	25.2	+9.4
Majority		1,120	23.3	−10.6
Turnout		4,795	38.4	+3.4
Conservative and Liberal Unionist hold		Swing	-5.3	

Nether Shire
Party	Candidate	Votes	%	±%
Labour	Charles Simms	2,323	53.9	−12.9
Liberal	John Weightman	931	21.6	+21.6
Conservative and Liberal Unionist	Ida Crowther	833	19.3	−7.7
Communist	Howard Hill	219	5.1	−1.0
Majority		1,392	32.3	−7.5
Turnout		4,306	31.9	+5.3
Labour hold		Swing	-17.2	

Norton
Party	Candidate	Votes	%	±%
Conservative and Liberal Unionist	Thornton Lambert	5,147	56.4	−1.1
Labour	Victor Francis	2,673	29.3	−4.8
Liberal	Ben Thorpe	1,311	14.3	+5.8
Majority		2,474	27.1	+3.7
Turnout		9,131	37.1	−3.3
Conservative and Liberal Unionist hold		Swing	+1.8	

Owlerton
Party	Candidate	Votes	%	±%
Labour	John Yeardley	1,860	48.8	−8.3
Conservative and Liberal Unionist	Irvine Patnick	985	25.8	−7.7
Liberal	Fred Crookes	648	17.0	+17.0
Communist	David Jeffrey	143	3.7	+3.7
Municipal Reform	Harry Hoyle	93	2.4	−6.9
Union Movement	William Kimber	80	2.1	+2.1
Majority		875	23.0	−0.5
Turnout		3,809	32.6	−2.6
Labour hold		Swing	-0.2	

Park
Party	Candidate	Votes	%	±%
Labour	Joseph Ashton	2,017	66.9	−0.7
Labour	Norman Goodchild	1,959		
Conservative and Liberal Unionist	S. Bell	641	21.3	−1.5
Communist	George Caborn	356	11.8	+2.2
Majority		1,376	45.6	+0.8
Turnout		3,014	27.6	−0.5
Labour hold		Swing		
Labour hold		Swing	+0.4	

Sharrow
Party	Candidate	Votes	%	±%
Labour	John Hill	1,792	45.3	−6.7
Conservative and Liberal Unionist	L. Nicholson	1,545	39.1	+3.3
Liberal	Gordon Wallace	427	10.8	+3.5
Union Movement	Barbara Wood	190	4.8	+4.8
Majority		247	6.2	−10.1
Turnout		3,954	36.1	−4.2
Labour hold		Swing	-5.0	

Southey Green
Party	Candidate	Votes	%	±%
Labour	Hector Bright	3,132	75.9	+2.4
Conservative and Liberal Unionist	Rhonda Beard	698	16.9	−2.7
Communist	Terence Devey	296	7.2	+0.3
Majority		2,434	59.0	+5.2
Turnout		4,126	23.8	−1.5
Labour hold		Swing	+2.5	

Tinsley
Party	Candidate	Votes	%	±%
Labour	Ron Ironmonger	2,250	79.4	+5.3
Conservative and Liberal Unionist	Patricia Santhouse	585	20.6	−5.3
Majority		1,665	58.8	+10.6
Turnout		2,835	26.4	−0.5
Labour hold		Swing	+5.3	

Walkley
Party	Candidate	Votes	%	±%
Labour	George Bennett	2,047	58.4	+1.0
Conservative and Liberal Unionist	Connie Dodson	1,257	35.9	−2.2
Union Movement	Francis Hamley	199	5.7	+1.3
Majority		790	22.5	+3.2
Turnout		3,503	28.2	−1.2
Labour hold		Swing	+1.6	

Woodseats
Party	Candidate	Votes	%	±%
Conservative and Liberal Unionist	Walter Morrison	3,199	53.6	−7.0
Labour	Dora Fitter	1,802	30.2	+0.9
Liberal	Colin Wood	968	16.2	+6.1
Majority		1,397	23.4	−7.9
Turnout		5,969	38.2	−0.2
Conservative and Liberal Unionist hold		Swing	-3.9	
