= 1970 Sheffield City Council election =

- 8 May 1970

28 councillors to Sheffield City Council
| | First party | Second party | Third party |
|---|---|---|---|
| Party | Labour | Conservative | Liberal |
| Seats won | 21 | 7 | 0 |
| Seat change | ▲6 | ▼5 | ▼1 |
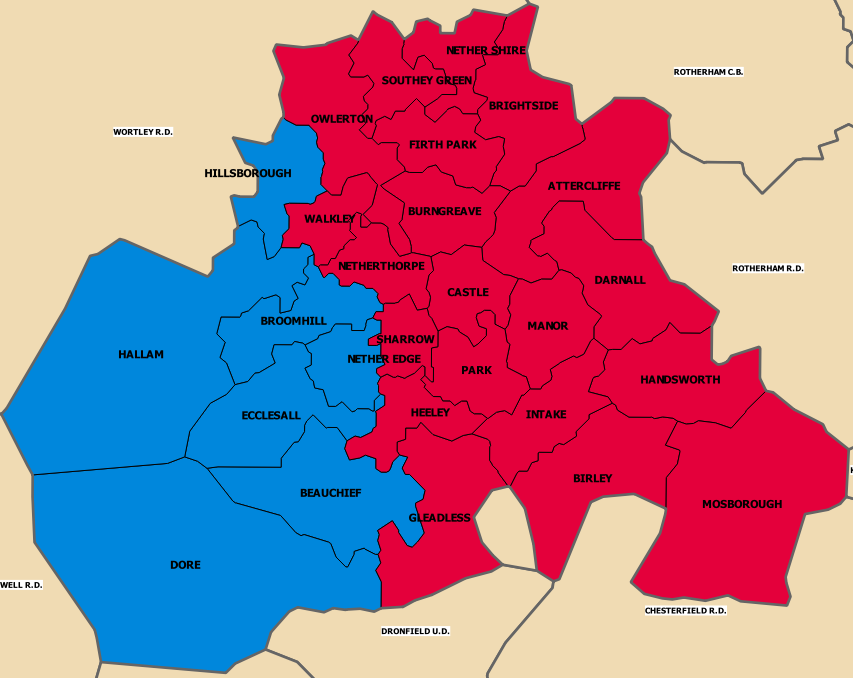
Majority party before election
Labour Party (UK)
Majority party after election
Labour Party (UK)

The 1970 Sheffield City Council election was held on 8 May 1970 with one third of the council up for election as well as a double vacancy in Mosborough. Since the previous election the Liberals had gained a seat from the Conservatives in a by-election in Heeley. This election seen a consolidation of Labour control, with a further six gains, helped by a more favourable national trend - especially so in the South Yorkshire region. For the first time since the mid-sixties, Labour won the most votes, which a "delighted" Alderman - and head of the Labour grouping - Sir Ron Ironmonger attributed to the youth;

"I said we expected to win four seats, with Gleadless as a possibility, but Heeley was a bonus. The national swing obviously helped, but the really hopeful sign was the greatly increased Labour vote. Our vote was well up in places, and it must be the first time for some years that the Labour vote has been bigger than the Conservatives. I have got to give the credit for this to the youngsters. This is the only new factor, and they are entitled to the credit."

Sir Ron went on to express confidence in both Labour's prospects for the next year's elections, remarking "As things are looking at the moment we could have an absolute landslide next year", and their ability to retain control of the council until the upcoming reorganisation in 1973. The re-elected Labour governance promised its attentions would be focused on two key aspects: the environment, in which a committee - or possibly sub-committee of the already existent Town Planning committee - would address environmental questions, and a deputation on the replacement of St. Catherine's school - an important issue during the campaign - would be organised as quickly as possible.

Meanwhile, the Conservatives, who had been hopeful of gaining several seats, seen their targets - Burngreave, Birley and Walkley - swing further away from their grasp. They also resounded to contest the Gleadless victor Colin Radcliffe's narrow win of six votes, headed by the Heeley agent Doreen Smith, claiming that unmarked ballot papers had been counted.

== Election result ==
Sheffield local election result 1970
| Party | Seats | Gains | Losses | Net gain/loss | Seats % | Votes % | Votes | +/− |
|---|---|---|---|---|---|---|---|---|
| Labour | 21 | 6 | 0 | +6 | 75.0 | 52.9 | 72,019 | +10.5 |
| Conservative | 7 | 0 | 5 | -5 | 25.0 | 44.3 | 60,322 | -8.5 |
| Liberal | 0 | 0 | 1 | -1 | 0.0 | 2.0 | 2,743 | +0.3 |
| Communist | 0 | 0 | 0 | 0 | 0.0 | 0.6 | 837 | -1.1 |
| Conservation | 0 | 0 | 0 | 0 | 0.0 | 0.1 | 118 | +0.1 |

The result had the following consequences for the total number of seats on the council after the elections:

| Party | Previous council | | New council | |
| Party | Cllr | Ald | Cllr | Ald |
|---|---|---|---|---|
| Labour | 39 | 18 | 45 | 18 |
| Conservatives | 42 | 9 | 35 | 9 |
| Liberals | 2 | 0 | 1 | 0 |
| Communists | 0 | 0 | 0 | 0 |
| Conservation | 0 | 0 | 0 | 0 |
| Total | 81 | 27 | 81 | 27 |
| Total | 108 | | 108 | |
| Working majority | -3 | 9 | 9 | 9 |
| Working majority | 6 | | 18 | |

== Ward results ==
Attercliffe
| Party | Candidate | Votes | % | ±% |
|---|---|---|---|---|
| Labour | Bill Robins | 2,310 | 76.7 | +5.7 |
| Conservative | Harold Mellor | 701 | 23.3 | −5.7 |
| Majority | | 1,609 | 54.4 | +11.4 |
| Turnout | | 3,011 | | |
| Labour hold | | Swing | +5.7 | |

Beauchief
| Party | Candidate | Votes | % | ±% |
|---|---|---|---|---|
| Conservative | Frank Adams | 5,184 | 76.6 | −5.6 |
| Labour | Bill Michie | 1,580 | 23.3 | +5.6 |
| Majority | | 3,604 | 53.3 | −11.2 |
| Turnout | | 6,764 | | |
| Conservative hold | | Swing | -5.6 | |

Birley
| Party | Candidate | Votes | % | ±% |
|---|---|---|---|---|
| Labour | Elsie Richardson | 4,178 | 62.6 | +12.8 |
| Conservative | Andrew Oxley | 2,497 | 37.4 | −7.7 |
| Majority | | 1,681 | 25.2 | +20.5 |
| Turnout | | 6,675 | | |
| Labour hold | | Swing | +10.2 | |

Brightside
| Party | Candidate | Votes | % | ±% |
|---|---|---|---|---|
| Labour | Adrian Molloy | 2,555 | 67.8 | +12.5 |
| Conservative | Kathleen Moore | 1,124 | 29.8 | −7.2 |
| Communist | Reg Arundel | 91 | 2.4 | +2.4 |
| Majority | | 1,431 | 37.9 | +19.8 |
| Turnout | | 3,770 | | |
| Labour hold | | Swing | +9.8 | |

Broomhill
| Party | Candidate | Votes | % | ±% |
|---|---|---|---|---|
| Conservative | Myrtle Jackson | 3,206 | 70.1 | −7.2 |
| Labour | John Baxter | 1,364 | 29.8 | +12.9 |
| Majority | | 1842 | 40.3 | −20.1 |
| Turnout | | 4,570 | | |
| Conservative hold | | Swing | -10.0 | |

Burngreave
| Party | Candidate | Votes | % | ±% |
|---|---|---|---|---|
| Labour | Reggie Ellis | 2,843 | 50.7 | −5.2 |
| Liberal | Francis Butler | 1,540 | 27.4 | +27.4 |
| Conservative | Len Scott | 1,179 | 21.0 | −19.4 |
| Communist | Martin Ashworth | 46 | 0.8 | −2.8 |
| Majority | | 1,303 | 23.2 | +7.7 |
| Turnout | | 5,608 | | |
| Labour hold | | Swing | -16.3 | |

Castle
| Party | Candidate | Votes | % | ±% |
|---|---|---|---|---|
| Labour | Roy Munn | 2,549 | 73.8 | +6.3 |
| Conservative | Kenneth Whitehouse | 819 | 23.7 | −1.7 |
| Communist | Edna Ashworth | 84 | 2.4 | −4.5 |
| Majority | | 1,730 | 50.1 | +8.1 |
| Turnout | | 3,452 | | |
| Labour hold | | Swing | +4.0 | |

Darnall
| Party | Candidate | Votes | % | ±% |
|---|---|---|---|---|
| Labour | Roy Hattersley | 3,486 | 69.0 | +10.0 |
| Conservative | Roger Outram | 1,566 | 31.0 | −10.0 |
| Majority | | 1,920 | 38.0 | +19.9 |
| Turnout | | 5,052 | | |
| Labour hold | | Swing | +10.0 | |

Dore
| Party | Candidate | Votes | % | ±% |
|---|---|---|---|---|
| Conservative | William Blake | 4,849 | 76.2 | −3.5 |
| Labour | William Kirk | 1,516 | 23.8 | +3.5 |
| Majority | | 3,333 | 52.4 | −7.0 |
| Turnout | | 6,365 | | |
| Conservative hold | | Swing | -3.5 | |

Ecclesall
| Party | Candidate | Votes | % | ±% |
|---|---|---|---|---|
| Conservative | John Neill | 4,267 | 79.8 | −4.0 |
| Labour | Marie Rodgers | 1,076 | 20.1 | +4.0 |
| Majority | | 5,343 | 59.7 | −8.0 |
| Turnout | | 3,191 | | |
| Conservative hold | | Swing | -4.0 | |

Firth Park
| Party | Candidate | Votes | % | ±% |
|---|---|---|---|---|
| Labour | Valerie Potts | 3,696 | 62.9 | +19.2 |
| Conservative | Jack Kerton | 2,080 | 35.4 | −4.1 |
| Communist | Barry Bracken | 99 | 1.7 | −1.5 |
| Majority | | 1,616 | 27.5 | +23.4 |
| Turnout | | 5,875 | | |
| Labour gain from Conservative | | Swing | +11.6 | |

Gleadless
| Party | Candidate | Votes | % | ±% |
|---|---|---|---|---|
| Labour | Colin Radcliffe | 3,535 | 46.2 | +11.8 |
| Conservative | Clifford Godber | 3,529 | 46.1 | −10.9 |
| Liberal | Dennis Boothroyd | 583 | 7.6 | −0.9 |
| Majority | | 6 | 0.1 | −22.6 |
| Turnout | | 7,647 | | |
| Labour gain from Liberal | | Swing | +11.4 | |

Hallam
| Party | Candidate | Votes | % | ±% |
|---|---|---|---|---|
| Conservative | Hazel Black | 3,859 | 73.5 | +3.1 |
| Labour | Charlotte Ellis | 1,388 | 26.4 | +8.5 |
| Majority | | 2,471 | 47.1 | −5.4 |
| Turnout | | 5,247 | | |
| Labour hold | | Swing | +2.7 | |

Handsworth
| Party | Candidate | Votes | % | ±% |
|---|---|---|---|---|
| Labour | Len Cope | 3,292 | 64.9 | +9.1 |
| Conservative | William Morris | 1,780 | 35.1 | −9.1 |
| Majority | | 1,512 | 29.8 | +18.2 |
| Turnout | | 5,072 | | |
| Labour hold | | Swing | +9.1 | |

Heeley
| Party | Candidate | Votes | % | ±% |
|---|---|---|---|---|
| Labour | Bernard Wilkinson | 3,204 | 51.7 | +15.0 |
| Conservative | James Garlick | 2,856 | 46.1 | −10.4 |
| Communist | Ken Turton | 138 | 2.2 | −4.6 |
| Majority | | 348 | 5.6 | −14.2 |
| Turnout | | 6,198 | | |
| Labour gain from Conservative | | Swing | +12.7 | |

Hillsborough
| Party | Candidate | Votes | % | ±% |
|---|---|---|---|---|
| Conservative | Ivor Wakley | 3,332 | 55.7 | −8.9 |
| Labour | Bill Meade | 2,644 | 44.2 | +8.9 |
| Majority | | 688 | 11.5 | −17.8 |
| Turnout | | 5,976 | | |
| Conservative hold | | Swing | -8.9 | |

Intake
| Party | Candidate | Votes | % | ±% |
|---|---|---|---|---|
| Labour | Arnold Wood | 3,934 | 58.1 | +11.0 |
| Conservative | Dennis Johnson | 2,835 | 41.9 | −11.0 |
| Majority | | 1,099 | 16.2 | +10.5 |
| Turnout | | 6,769 | | |
| Labour gain from Conservative | | Swing | +11.0 | |

Manor
| Party | Candidate | Votes | % | ±% |
|---|---|---|---|---|
| Labour | George Armitage | 2,889 | 76.9 | +17.3 |
| Conservative | Peter Huddart | 792 | 21.1 | −12.9 |
| Communist | John Hukin | 75 | 2.0 | −4.4 |
| Majority | | 2,097 | 55.8 | +30.2 |
| Turnout | | 3,756 | | |
| Labour hold | | Swing | +15.1 | |

Mosborough
| Party | Candidate | Votes | % | ±% |
|---|---|---|---|---|
| Labour | Dorothy Walton | 2,876 | 64.7 | +1.9 |
| Labour | Harry Havenhand | 2,826 | | |
| Conservative | Hugh Rowbotham | 1,222 | 27.5 | −9.7 |
| Conservative | Stanley Titerington | 1,101 | | |
| Liberal | Colin Wood | 344 | 7.7 | +7.7 |
| Majority | | 1,604 | 37.2 | +11.6 |
| Turnout | | 4,442 | | |
| Labour hold | | Swing | | |
| Labour gain from Conservative | | Swing | +5.8 | |

Nether Edge
| Party | Candidate | Votes | % | ±% |
|---|---|---|---|---|
| Conservative | Michael Black | 3,319 | 71.9 | −8.0 |
| Labour | Adam Pemberton | 1,179 | 25.5 | +5.4 |
| Conservation | Barry Cummings | 118 | 2.6 | +2.6 |
| Majority | | 2,140 | 46.4 | −13.4 |
| Turnout | | 4,616 | | |
| Conservative hold | | Swing | -6.7 | |

Nether Shire
| Party | Candidate | Votes | % | ±% |
|---|---|---|---|---|
| Labour | Charles Simms | 2,850 | 65.6 | +13.5 |
| Conservative | Frank Dunn | 1,118 | 25.7 | −15.7 |
| Liberal | Albert Hattersley | 276 | 6.3 | +6.3 |
| Communist | Ken Hattersley | 100 | 2.3 | −4.2 |
| Majority | | 1,732 | 39.9 | +29.2 |
| Turnout | | 4,344 | | |
| Labour hold | | Swing | +14.6 | |

Netherthorpe
| Party | Candidate | Votes | % | ±% |
|---|---|---|---|---|
| Labour | Enid Hattersley | 2,576 | 67.3 | +9.7 |
| Conservative | Tony Hutt | 1,251 | 32.7 | −5.1 |
| Majority | | 1,325 | 34.6 | +14.8 |
| Turnout | | 3,827 | | |
| Labour hold | | Swing | +7.4 | |

Owlerton
| Party | Candidate | Votes | % | ±% |
|---|---|---|---|---|
| Labour | Roy Thwaites | 3,066 | 67.8 | +5.9 |
| Conservative | Patrick Fenoughty | 1,452 | 32.1 | −5.9 |
| Majority | | 1,614 | 35.7 | +11.8 |
| Turnout | | 4,518 | | |
| Labour hold | | Swing | +5.9 | |

Park
| Party | Candidate | Votes | % | ±% |
|---|---|---|---|---|
| Labour | Peter Jones | 3,174 | 77.4 | +12.7 |
| Conservative | David Else | 828 | 20.2 | −8.4 |
| Communist | Cyril Morton | 97 | 2.4 | −4.3 |
| Majority | | 2,346 | 57.2 | +21.1 |
| Turnout | | 4,099 | | |
| Labour hold | | Swing | +10.5 | |

Sharrow
| Party | Candidate | Votes | % | ±% |
|---|---|---|---|---|
| Labour | Alfred Wood | 2,833 | 60.4 | +12.5 |
| Conservative | Colin Barnsley | 1,859 | 39.6 | −4.2 |
| Majority | | 974 | 20.8 | +16.7 |
| Turnout | | 4,692 | | |
| Labour gain from Conservative | | Swing | +8.3 | |

Southey Green
| Party | Candidate | Votes | % | ±% |
|---|---|---|---|---|
| Labour | David Blunkett | 2,619 | 79.9 | +14.7 |
| Conservative | Charles Hughes | 551 | 16.8 | −10.1 |
| Communist | Gordon Ashberry | 107 | 3.2 | −4.5 |
| Majority | | 2,068 | 63.1 | +24.9 |
| Turnout | | 3,277 | | |
| Labour hold | | Swing | +12.4 | |

Walkley
| Party | Candidate | Votes | % | ±% |
|---|---|---|---|---|
| Labour | Jack Towns | 2,807 | 55.3 | +15.4 |
| Conservative | Stanley Parnell | 2,267 | 44.7 | +5.1 |
| Majority | | 540 | 10.6 | +10.2 |
| Turnout | | 5,074 | | |
| Labour hold | | Swing | +5.1 | |
