= 1968 Sheffield City Council election =

Election held on 9 May 1968

← 1967	9 May 1968	1969 →

30 councillors to Sheffield City Council
	First party	Second party
Party	Conservative	Labour
Seats won	22	8
Seat change	▲8	▼7
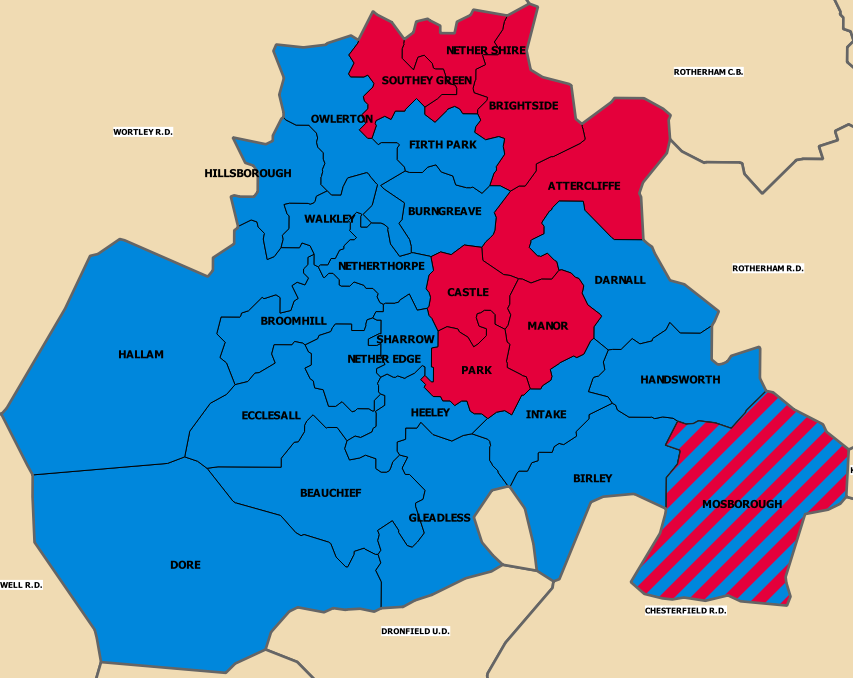
Majority party before election
Labour Party (UK)
Majority party after election
Conservative Party (UK)

The 1968 Sheffield City Council election was held on 9 May 1968, with a third of the council up for vote, alongside three double vacancies in Broomhill, Handsworth and Mosborough. Overall turnout was 33.9%, a continuation of the preceding year's improvement.

Following on from the previous year's momentous wins by the Conservatives, this historic night seen them surpass those and win control of the council for the first time since 1932, when it won as the Conservative-Liberal combination Progressives party. This election and the previous followed the national trend of Labour suffering massive losses around the country, even in their heartlands, with only two cities left Labour-controlled after these elections - Hull and Stoke - and even there the Tories were making significant inroads.

The results were met with jubilant scenes in the town hall, where the Conservatives opened bottles of champagne and celebrated. The leader of the Conservative group, alderman Harold Hebblethwaite, remarked:

"Tonight is a wonderful night. It is a narrow majority, nevertheless, it is a workable majority. This victory is the plum which the Conservative Party have been looking for nationally, and here it is. I am not used to making emotional statements such as 'to the victors the spoils' but it follows naturally from our victory that we shall take the committee chairmanships and deputy chairmanships. We will have to do that to control policy. We have a majority of only four but I would emphasise that if we had had this majority last year with the opportunity to manipulate aldermanic seats our majority on the council floor would have been 14."

Labour Park councillor Joe Ashton, wrote "we will return" on the wall of the Town Hall whip's office in response to the defeat.

The Conservatives gained seven seats from Labour in Birley, Darnall, Firth Park, Netherthorpe, Owlerton, Sharrow and Walkley, as well as the sole Independent seat in Mosborough. These gains transformed a narrow deficit in councillors, to a thirteen-strong majority. A poll of voters in the Darnall ward (an invariably Labour-won seat since 1945) was commissioned by the Morning Telegraph four days prior to the election, correctly predicting a Conservative gain with a swing to the Conservatives of 5.5% - a figure that was exceeded by one per cent on the night. Unfortunately for the Conservatives, the aldermanic elections weren't until 1970, and two-thirds of those currently represented Labour, reducing their majority to just 4, and as such, difficult to govern with. Aside from numerical difficulties, the recent report from the City's Treasurer precipitated financial restraint, so the incoming governments options were one of either cuts to the council's services, or rises in the city's rates.

== Election result ==
Sheffield local election result 1968
Party	Seats	Gains	Losses	Net gain/loss	Seats %	Votes %	Votes	+/−
Conservative	22	8	0	+8	73.3	57.4	72,763	+7.0
Labour	8	0	7	-7	26.7	36.0	45,555	-2.2
Communist	0	0	0	0	0.0	2.4	3,006	-2.0
Liberal	0	0	0	0	0.0	2.1	2,697	-2.1
Other	0	0	1	-1	0.0	2.1	2,652	-0.6

The result had the following consequences for the total number of seats on the Council after the elections:

Party	Previous council		New council	
Party	Cllr	Ald	Cllr	Ald
Conservatives	39	9	47	9
Labour	41	18	34	18
Communists	0	0	0	0
Liberals	0	0	0	0
Independent	1	0	0	0
Total	81	27	81	27
Total	108		108	
Working majority	1	9	13	-9
Working majority	10		4	

== Ward results ==
Attercliffe
Party	Candidate	Votes	%	±%
Labour	Harry Firth	2,257	66.4	−4.7
Conservative	Harold Mellor	1,141	33.6	+4.7
Majority		1,116	32.8	−9.4
Turnout		3,398	21.2	−1.6
Labour hold		Swing	-4.7	

Beauchief
Party	Candidate	Votes	%	±%
Conservative	Thomas Crewe	6,303	82.9	+11.4
Labour	Kenneth Morgan	1,300	17.1	−11.4
Majority		5,003	65.8	+22.8
Turnout		7,603	53.1	+3.4
Conservative hold		Swing	+11.4	

Birley
Party	Candidate	Votes	%	±%
Conservative	Danny George	2,507	54.1	+15.8
Labour	Leonard Stones	1,903	41.1	+0.5
Independent	Laurence Gillatt	221	4.8	−16.3
Majority		604	13.0	+10.8
Turnout		4,631	31.2	+1.9
Conservative gain from Labour		Swing	+7.6	

Brightside
Party	Candidate	Votes	%	±%
Labour	George Wilson	1,838	52.8	+1.3
Conservative	Leonard Scott	1,261	36.2	+6.7
National Front	George Clark	214	6.1	−3.7
Communist	Joe Stevens	170	4.9	−4.3
Majority		577	16.6	−5.4
Turnout		3,483	27.1	+1.5
Labour hold		Swing	-2.7	

Broomhill
Party	Candidate	Votes	%	±%
Conservative	Graham Cheetham	3,560	66.4	−10.8
Conservative	A. Smith	3,419		
Labour	Annie Britton	999	18.6	−4.2
Liberal	J. Garb	804	15.0	+15.0
Majority		2,561	47.7	−6.6
Turnout		5,363	33.1	−0.8
Conservative hold		Swing		
Conservative hold		Swing	-3.3	

Burngreave
Party	Candidate	Votes	%	±%
Conservative	Jack Osborne	1,842	49.7	+5.1
Labour	Harry Hall	1,567	42.3	+4.6
Communist	Jim Ashurst	172	4.6	−4.5
	D. Biddles	124	3.4	+3.4
Majority		275	7.4	+5.8
Turnout		3,705	27.3	−0.3
Conservative hold		Swing	+0.2	

Castle
Party	Candidate	Votes	%	±%
Labour	Roy Munn	1,759	54.0	+2.6
Conservative	Simon Newall	1,109	34.0	−2.6
	G. May	217	4.8	+4.8
Communist	Edna Ashworth	174	5.3	−7.2
Majority		650	19.9	+4.7
Turnout		3,259	28.9	+2.5
Labour hold		Swing	+2.3	

Darnall
Party	Candidate	Votes	%	±%
Conservative	J. Heath	2,395	50.9	+6.6
Labour	Arnold Wood	2,312	49.1	−6.6
Majority		83	1.7	−9.6
Turnout		4,707	30.4	−2.8
Conservative gain from Labour		Swing	+6.6	

Dore
Party	Candidate	Votes	%	±%
Conservative	Patricia Santhouse	5,039	80.3	+2.5
Labour	John Cornwell	1,235	19.7	−2.5
Majority		3,804	60.3	+5.0
Turnout		6,274	48.7	+5.3
Conservative hold		Swing	+2.5	

Ecclesall
Party	Candidate	Votes	%	±%
Conservative	Andrew Cook	4,844	78.1	+9.3
Liberal	A. Barrett	720	11.6	−5.5
Labour	Leon Harris	636	10.2	−3.8
Majority		4,124	67.9	+16.2
Turnout		6,200	42.7	−0.1
Conservative hold		Swing	+7.4	

Firth Park
Party	Candidate	Votes	%	±%
Conservative	Madge Kerton	2,163	46.0	+6.1
Labour	Tom Lowe	1,846	39.3	+1.2
Liberal	Francis Butler	471	10.0	−2.4
Communist	R. Wilkinson	217	4.6	−4.9
Majority		317	6.7	5.0
Turnout		4,697	32.8	+1.2
Conservative gain from Labour		Swing	+2.4	

Gleadless
Party	Candidate	Votes	%	±%
Conservative	Charles Davison	4,089	63.8	+8.3
Labour	Alfred Wood	1,952	30.4	−2.4
Liberal	Dennis Boothroyd	370	5.8	−5.9
Majority		2,137	33.3	+10.7
Turnout		6,411	46.5	−4.0
Conservative hold		Swing	+5.3	

Hallam
Party	Candidate	Votes	%	±%
Conservative	Guy Walker	4,321	79.6	+1.2
Labour	Jack Watson	1,108	20.4	−1.2
Majority		3,213	59.2	+2.3
Turnout		5,429	39.5	+0.7
Conservative hold		Swing	+1.2	

Handsworth
Party	Candidate	Votes	%	±%
Conservative	Francis Brookes	2,105	50.5	+1.0
Conservative	Jack Kerton	2,073		
Labour	James Pearson	2,066	49.5	−1.0
Labour	George Nicholls	2,064		
Majority		7	0.9	−0.2
Turnout		4,171	32.7	−5.6
Conservative hold		Swing		
Conservative hold		Swing	+1.0	

Heeley
Party	Candidate	Votes	%	±%
Conservative	Michael Swain	3,855	57.7	+8.9
Labour	Peter Jones	2,413	36.1	−5.4
Communist	Robert Moody	407	6.1	−3.6
Majority		1,442	21.6	+14.3
Turnout		6,675	40.5	−1.7
Conservative hold		Swing	+7.1	

Hillsborough
Party	Candidate	Votes	%	±%
Conservative	Irvine Patnick	4,309	68.3	+8.8
Labour	Albert Morris	1,997	31.7	−8.8
Majority		2,312	36.7	+17.5
Turnout		6,306	42.8	−4.2
Conservative hold		Swing	+8.8	

Intake
Party	Candidate	Votes	%	±%
Conservative	Frank Woodger	2,920	57.2	+5.3
Labour	Joseph Albaya	2,181	42.7	−5.3
Majority		739	14.5	+10.6
Turnout		5,101	32.6	−2.7
Conservative hold		Swing	+5.3	

Manor
Party	Candidate	Votes	%	±%
Labour	George Machin	1,785	49.3	+3.5
Conservative	Raymond Brown	1,410	38.9	+5.7
Communist	John Hukin	425	11.7	−9.2
Majority		375	10.3	−2.1
Turnout		3,620	25.8	−1.0
Labour hold		Swing	-1.1	

Mosborough
Party	Candidate	Votes	%	±%
Conservative	Hugh Rowbotham	1,532	50.5	+24.1
Labour	Dorothy Walton	1,498	49.4	+13.6
Labour	Harry Havenhand	1,415		
Conservative	Eric Vawser	1,317		
Majority		83	1.1	−0.9
Turnout		3,030	33.6	+2.8
Conservative gain from Independent		Swing		
Labour hold		Swing	-5.2	

Nether Edge
Party	Candidate	Votes	%	±%
Conservative	Charles Macdonald	4,515	82.8	+17.7
Labour	Charles Hayward	938	17.2	−1.3
Majority		3,577	65.6	+19.0
Turnout		5,453	39.8	+3.9
Conservative hold		Swing	+9.5	

Nether Shire
Party	Candidate	Votes	%	±%
Labour	Fred Staton	1,928	39.5	+1.7
Conservative	Michael Black	1,792	36.7	+3.8
	R. Hewitt	567	11.6	+11.6
Liberal	Albert Hattersley	332	6.8	−9.7
Communist	Ken Hattersley	266	5.4	−7.4
Majority		136	2.8	−2.0
Turnout		4,885	39.4	+4.0
Labour hold		Swing	-1.0	

Netherthorpe
Party	Candidate	Votes	%	±%
Conservative	Jean Grindrod	1,486	45.9	+8.7
Labour	Marie Rodgers	1,483	45.8	−1.5
Communist	Roy Barrett	270	8.3	−7.2
Majority		3	0.1	−10.0
Turnout		3,239	28.9	+2.3
Conservative gain from Labour		Swing	+5.1	

Owlerton
Party	Candidate	Votes	%	±%
Conservative	Nesta Bennett	1,509	45.8	+15.3
Labour	John Yeardley	1,435	43.6	−3.0
Communist	Dave Jeffery	349	10.6	−1.0
Majority		74	2.2	−13.7
Turnout		3,293	22.5	−3.1
Conservative gain from Labour		Swing	+9.1	

Park
Party	Candidate	Votes	%	±%
Labour	Dennis Dunn	1,726	47.0	−4.7
Conservative	June Harris	1,145	31.1	−2.6
	M. Macdonald	631	12.1	+12.1
Communist	Cyril Morton	172	4.7	−9.8
Majority		581	15.8	−2.1
Turnout		3,674	24.8	−1.0
Labour hold		Swing	-1.0	

Sharrow
Party	Candidate	Votes	%	±%
Conservative	J. Pashley	2,388	51.5	+11.2
Labour	Ethel Evans	2,039	44.0	+4.7
National Front	Barrie Bolton	204	4.5	−3.9
Majority		349	7.5	+6.5
Turnout		4,631	39.3	+1.8
Conservative gain from Labour		Swing	+3.2	

Southey Green
Party	Candidate	Votes	%	±%
Labour	Francis O'Shaughnessy	1,478	52.1	−0.0
Conservative	Charles Hughes	975	34.4	+2.4
Communist	Gordon Ashberry	384	13.5	−2.3
Majority		503	17.7	−2.4
Turnout		2,837	21.0	−0.6
Labour hold		Swing	-1.2	

Walkley
Party	Candidate	Votes	%	±%
Conservative	John Goodram	2,248	48.9	+3.4
Labour	Bernard Kidd	1,876	40.8	−4.7
National Front	Alan Holmes	244	5.3	−3.7
	G. Bohannon	230	5.0	+5.0
Majority		372	8.1	+8.1
Turnout		4,598	31.5	+2.7
Conservative gain from Labour		Swing	+4.0	
