= 1966 Sheffield City Council election =

← 1965	May 1966	1967 →

30 councillors to Sheffield City Council
	First party	Second party
Party	Labour	Conservative
Seats won	22	8
Seat change	0	0
Majority party before election
Labour Party (UK)
Majority party after election
Labour Party (UK)

The 1966 Sheffield City Council elections were held in May, with one third of the council up for election and double vacancies in five wards - Cathedral, Ecclesall, Manor, Tinsley and Woodseats. There were no changes in seats, with overall turnout slumping to a low of 22.5% being the main story of the night.

== Election result ==
Sheffield local election result 1966
Party	Seats	Gains	Losses	Net gain/loss	Seats %	Votes %	Votes	+/−
Labour	22	0	0	0	73.3	48.1	36,939	+1.2
Conservative	8	0	0	0	26.7	42.9	32,918	-1.5
Liberal	0	0	0	0	0.0	5.9	4,510	-0.4
Communist	0	0	0	0	0.0	2.4	1,867	+0.0
Nationalist Party	0	0	0	0	0.0	0.7	523	+0.7

The result had the following consequences for the total number of seats on the Council after the elections:

Party	Previous council		New council	
Party	Cllr	Ald	Cllr	Ald
Labour	54	18	54	18
Conservatives	21	7	21	7
Liberals	0	0	0	0
Communists	0	0	0	0
Nationalists	0	0	0	0
Total	75	25	75	25
Total	100		100	
Working majority	33	11	33	11
Working majority	44		44	

== Ward results ==
Attercliffe
Party	Candidate	Votes	%	±%
Labour	G. Goodenough	1,127	84.4	+0.9
Conservative	Frank Woodger	208	15.6	−0.9
Majority		919	68.8	+1.8
Turnout		1,335	10.5	−2.6
Labour hold		Swing	+0.9	

Brightside
Party	Candidate	Votes	%	±%
Labour	Henry Sturrock	1,177	88.8	−0.5
Communist	Arthur Tingle	149	11.2	+0.5
Majority		1,028	77.6	−1.0
Turnout		1,326	11.2	−0.6
Labour hold		Swing	-0.5	

Broomhill
Party	Candidate	Votes	%	±%
Conservative	Peter Jackson	2,443	70.1	+7.1
Labour	Harry Firth	601	17.2	−1.9
Liberal	C. Cremar	439	12.6	−5.2
Majority		1,842	52.9	+9.1
Turnout		3,483	25.8	−8.4
Conservative hold		Swing	+4.5	

Burngreave
Party	Candidate	Votes	%	±%
Labour	Reggie Ellis	1,223	71.7	+9.1
Conservative	Guy Walker	396	23.2	−7.5
Communist	W. March	87	5.1	−1.6
Majority		827	48.5	+16.6
Turnout		1,706	16.8	−5.0
Labour hold		Swing	+8.3	

Cathedral
Party	Candidate	Votes	%	±%
Labour	Enid Hattersley	1,131	76.0	+1.8
Labour	Joseph Albaya	963		
Conservative	Jack Kerton	203	13.6	−12.2
Nationalist Party	Robert Taylor	154	10.3	+10.3
Majority		928	62.4	14.0
Turnout		1,488	17.1	−4.7
Labour hold		Swing		
Labour hold		Swing	+7.0	

Crookesmoor
Party	Candidate	Votes	%	±%
Labour	John Tomlinson	1,126	59.2	+10.7
Conservative	Agnes Edeson	629	33.0	+4.8
Communist	T. Barrett	148	7.8	−0.2
Majority		497	26.1	+6.0
Turnout		1,903	22.1	−6.9
Labour hold		Swing	+2.9	

Darnall
Party	Candidate	Votes	%	±%
Labour	Frederick Hattersley	1,832	61.0	+5.1
Conservative	Kathleen Circuit	838	27.9	+0.5
Liberal	Colin Andrews	169	5.6	−4.8
Communist	Alan Ecclestone	165	5.5	−0.8
Majority		994	33.1	+4.6
Turnout		3,004	16.8	−2.6
Labour hold		Swing	+2.3	

Ecclesall
Party	Candidate	Votes	%	±%
Conservative	John Neill	4,060	65.9	−9.7
Conservative	Andrew Cook	3604		
Liberal	Brian Bell	1,249	20.3	+5.7
Labour	Leon Harris	852	13.8	+3.9
Majority		3208	52.1	−9.0
Turnout		6,161	37.3	+0.7
Conservative hold		Swing		
Conservative hold		Swing	-7.7	

Firth Park
Party	Candidate	Votes	%	±%
Labour	Charles Hayward	1,368	57.9	+2.0
Conservative	John Levick	915	38.7	−1.8
Communist	Robert Moody	79	3.3	−0.3
Majority		453	19.2	+3.8
Turnout		2,362	19.2	−3.5
Labour hold		Swing	+1.9	

Hallam
Party	Candidate	Votes	%	±%
Conservative	Alan Blake	3,419	64.8	+1.8
Labour	Valerie Potts	1,156	21.9	+0.2
Liberal	Alan Thompson	703	13.3	−2.0
Majority		2,263	42.9	+1.5
Turnout		5,278	30.1	−6.7
Conservative hold		Swing	+0.8	

Handsworth
Party	Candidate	Votes	%	±%
Labour	George Salmons	2,652	60.2	+5.8
Conservative	Marvyn Moore	1,245	28.3	−3.5
Liberal	Ken Peace	504	11.4	−2.3
Majority		1,407	32.0	+9.3
Turnout		4,401	19.6	−4.6
Labour hold		Swing	+4.6	

Heeley
Party	Candidate	Votes	%	±%
Labour	Peter Jones	2,137	51.9	+5.1
Conservative	Charles Davison	1,281	31.1	−3.4
Liberal	Graham Oxley	530	14.1	+0.0
Communist	Edna Ashworth	116	2.8	−1.8
Majority		856	20.8	+8.5
Turnout		4,114	32.9	−1.2
Labour hold		Swing	+4.2	

Hillsborough
Party	Candidate	Votes	%	±%
Labour	William Meade	2,389	49.9	+8.3
Conservative	Irvine Patnick	2,223	46.4	−11.9
Nationalist Party	J. Judge	173	3.6	+3.6
Majority		166	3.5	−13.3
Turnout		4,785	32.1	−2.4
Labour hold		Swing	+10.1	

Manor
Party	Candidate	Votes	%	±%
Labour	George Nicholls	1,551	84.4	−7.6
Labour	John Cornwell	1,430		
Communist	John Hukin	287	15.6	+7.6
Majority		1,264	68.8	−15.2
Turnout		1,838	11.6	−2.7
Labour hold		Swing		
Labour hold		Swing	-7.6	

Moor
Party	Candidate	Votes	%	±%
Labour	Roy Munn	1,248	65.8	+8.7
Conservative	David Stephenson	564	29.7	−10.2
Communist	M. Carlisle	84	4.4	+1.5
Majority		684	36.1	+19.0
Turnout		1,896	19.4	−4.9
Labour hold		Swing	+9.4	

Nether Edge
Party	Candidate	Votes	%	±%
Conservative	Harry Mercer	2,165	62.7	+4.0
Labour	R. Walker	732	21.2	−4.1
Liberal	Dennis Boothroyd	558	16.1	+0.2
Majority		1,433	41.5	+8.1
Turnout		3,455	28.5	−6.2
Conservative hold		Swing	+4.0	

Nether Shire
Party	Candidate	Votes	%	±%
Labour	Charles Moseley	1,560	84.6	−7.6
Communist	Ken Hattersley	285	15.4	+7.6
Majority		1,275	69.1	−15.2
Turnout		1,845	14.3	−1.5
Labour hold		Swing	-7.6	

Norton
Party	Candidate	Votes	%	±%
Conservative	Patricia Santhouse	5,300	65.7	+3.4
Labour	James Pearson	2,765	34.3	−3.4
Majority		2,535	31.4	+6.9
Turnout		8,065	31.7	−5.4
Conservative hold		Swing	+3.4	

Owlerton
Party	Candidate	Votes	%	±%
Labour	W. Watson	1,225	54.5	+0.5
Conservative	Madge Kerton	559	24.9	−11.7
Liberal	George Harry Manley	308	13.7	+13.7
Communist	Dave Jeffries	154	6.8	−2.5
Majority		666	29.6	+12.3
Turnout		2,246	18.0	−5.6
Labour hold		Swing	+6.1	

Park
Party	Candidate	Votes	%	±%
Labour	Dennis Dunn	1,250	75.2	−1.0
Conservative	June Harris	322	19.4	+3.0
Communist	Cyril Morton	89	5.3	−2.0
Majority		928	55.8	−4.0
Turnout		1,661	14.5	−4.1
Labour hold		Swing	-2.0	

Sharrow
Party	Candidate	Votes	%	±%
Labour	Annie Britton	1,988	55.9	+5.2
Conservative	Martyn Atkinson	1,567	44.1	−5.2
Majority		421	11.8	+10.3
Turnout		3,555	35.7	+1.0
Labour hold		Swing	+5.2	

Southey Green
Party	Candidate	Votes	%	±%
Labour	Arnold Crosby	1,366	85.9	−1.8
Communist	Raymond Southall	224	14.1	+1.8
Majority		1,142	71.8	−3.6
Turnout		1,590	9.9	−3.9
Labour hold		Swing	-1.8	

Tinsley
Party	Candidate	Votes	%	±%
Labour	Tom Lowe	1,070	75.7	+4.8
Labour	George Wilson	1,021		
Conservative	Eric Turner	344	24.3	+4.2
Conservative	Joan Willows	291		
Majority		726	51.3	+0.7
Turnout		1,414	15.9	−2.3
Labour hold		Swing		
Labour hold		Swing	+0.3	

Walkley
Party	Candidate	Votes	%	±%
Labour	Jack Towns	1,349	57.4	+4.7
Conservative	B. Lee	804	34.2	−13.0
Nationalist Party	H. Jones	196	8.3	+8.3
Majority		545	23.2	+17.8
Turnout		2,349	19.9	−7.6
Labour hold		Swing	+8.8	

Woodseats
Party	Candidate	Votes	%	±%
Conservative	George Beardshaw	3,433	62.4	−0.8
Conservative	Thomas Crewe	3,357		
Labour	Bernard Kidd	2,064	37.5	+0.8
Labour	George Machin	2,043		
Majority		1,369	24.9	−1.6
Turnout		5,497	35.8	−2.6
Conservative hold		Swing		
Conservative hold		Swing	-0.8	
