= 1964 Sheffield City Council election =

← 1963	7 May 1964	1965 →

25 councillors to Sheffield City Council
	First party	Second party
Party	Labour	Conservative
Seats won	18	7
Seat change	0	0
Majority party before election
Labour Party (UK)
Majority party after election
Labour Party (UK)

The 1964 Sheffield City Council election was held on 7 May 1964 with one third of the council up for election. The election campaign was quieter than most, with fewer parties contesting, and a smaller number of candidates than recent years (64 stood). The election saw no change in seats and a slightly reduced turnout of 29%.

== Election result ==
Sheffield local election result 1964
Party	Seats	Gains	Losses	Net gain/loss	Seats %	Votes %	Votes	+/−
Labour	18	0	0	0	72.0	55.0	54,585	+2.3
Conservative	7	0	0	0	28.0	38.3	38,084	+4.6
Liberal	0	0	0	0	0.0	4.7	4,644	-5.6
Communist	0	0	0	0	0.0	2.0	2,005	+0.2

The result had the following consequences for the total number of seats on the Council after the elections:

Party	Previous council		New council	
Party	Cllr	Ald	Cllr	Ald
Labour	55	18	55	18
Conservatives	20	7	20	7
Liberals	0	0	0	0
Communists	0	0	0	0
Total	75	25	75	25
Total	100		100	
Working majority	35	11	35	11
Working majority	46		46	

== Ward results ==
Attercliffe
Party	Candidate	Votes	%	±%
Labour	William Twigg	1,856	78.4	+7.4
Conservative	Ruth Hawson	308	13.0	+1.4
Liberal	Wilfred Dunderdale	203	8.6	−3.6
Majority		1,548	65.4	+6.0
Turnout		2,367	17.3	−2.5
Labour hold		Swing	+3.0	

Brightside
Party	Candidate	Votes	%	±%
Labour	Dora Fitter	1,722	85.2	+7.1
Communist	Henry Hardwick	298	14.7	+2.0
Majority		1,424	70.5	+5.1
Turnout		2,020	17.4	−3.5
Labour hold		Swing	+2.5	

Broomhill
Party	Candidate	Votes	%	±%
Conservative	John Peile	3,015	68.5	+8.8
Labour	Marie Hogg	873	19.8	−1.2
Liberal	Winifred Holt	510	11.6	−7.7
Majority		2,142	48.7	+10.0
Turnout		4,398	30.2	−2.4
Conservative hold		Swing	+5.0	

Burngreave
Party	Candidate	Votes	%	±%
Labour	Alf Wild	1,855	68.9	−1.9
Conservative	Frank Adams	836	31.1	+1.9
Majority		1,019	37.9	−3.8
Turnout		2,691	26.0	−5.7
Labour hold		Swing	-1.9	

Cathedral
Party	Candidate	Votes	%	±%
Labour	George Sharpe	2,094	83.3	−4.4
Conservative	Catherine Campbell	420	16.7	+16.7
Majority		1,674	66.6	−8.9
Turnout		2,514	26.9	−0.5
Labour hold		Swing	-10.5	

Crookesmoor
Party	Candidate	Votes	%	±%
Labour	Maurice Roberts	1,467	58.6	−1.7
Conservative	Irvine Patnick	878	35.1	+9.0
Communist	Derek Quinn	156	6.2	+3.3
Majority		589	23.5	−10.7
Turnout		2,501	26.6	−6.6
Labour hold		Swing	-5.3	

Darnall
Party	Candidate	Votes	%	±%
Labour	William Owen	2,677	59.3	+3.4
Conservative	Frank Burrow	1,129	25.0	+4.7
Liberal	Joseph Hinchcliffe	424	9.4	−7.4
Communist	Alan Ecclestone	280	6.2	−0.7
Majority		1,548	34.3	−1.2
Turnout		4,510	24.5	−2.8
Labour hold		Swing	-0.6	

Ecclesall
Party	Candidate	Votes	%	±%
Conservative	Daniel O'Neill	4,610	83.1	+0.7
Labour	Joseph Albaya	935	16.8	−0.7
Majority		3,675	66.3	+1.4
Turnout		5,545	33.6	−1.2
Conservative hold		Swing	+0.7	

Firth Park
Party	Candidate	Votes	%	±%
Labour	Norman Bentley	2,292	60.3	−3.0
Conservative	Raymond Hadfield	1,325	34.9	+1.7
Communist	Rob Moody	182	4.8	+4.8
Majority		967	25.4	−4.7
Turnout		3,799	29.7	−2.1
Labour hold		Swing	-2.3	

Hallam
Party	Candidate	Votes	%	±%
Conservative	Reginald Ashmore	3,855	57.1	+1.1
Labour	John Morley	1,888	28.0	+2.8
Liberal	David Chambers	1,002	14.8	−3.8
Majority		1,967	29.1	−1.7
Turnout		6,745	39.1	−1.6
Conservative hold		Swing	-0.8	

Handsworth
Party	Candidate	Votes	%	±%
Labour	Albert Richardson	3,447	57.3	−1.1
Conservative	Charles Macdonald	1,720	28.6	+5.1
Liberal	Ken Peace	848	14.1	−4.0
Majority		1,727	28.7	−6.1
Turnout		6,015	28.9	−2.9
Labour hold		Swing	-3.1	

Heeley
Party	Candidate	Votes	%	±%
Labour	John Sewell	2,616	56.4	+1.4
Conservative	John Barraclough	1,401	30.2	+3.1
Liberal	Graham Oxley	489	10.5	−4.6
Communist	Joe Stevenson	129	2.8	+0.1
Majority		1,215	26.2	−1.6
Turnout		4,635	38.0	−5.4
Labour hold		Swing	-0.8	

Hillsborough
Party	Candidate	Votes	%	±%
Conservative	Kenneth Arnold	2,810	51.4	+17.6
Labour	Roy Thwaites	2,659	48.6	+3.9
Majority		151	2.7	−8.2
Turnout		5,469	40.0	−8.6
Conservative hold		Swing	+6.8	

Manor
Party	Candidate	Votes	%	±%
Labour	Austin Conroy	2,657	90.8	+11.6
Communist	John Hukin	269	9.2	+1.2
Majority		2,388	81.6	+15.4
Turnout		2,926	18.9	−5.1
Labour hold		Swing	+5.2	

Moor
Party	Candidate	Votes	%	±%
Labour	Peter Horton	1,863	68.0	+3.0
Conservative	Rupert Bishop	877	32.0	−0.7
Majority		986	36.0	+3.7
Turnout		2,740	27.7	−6.5
Labour hold		Swing	+1.8	

Nether Edge
Party	Candidate	Votes	%	±%
Conservative	Ivan Harrington	2,309	54.6	+6.0
Labour	Frank Hooley	1,290	30.5	+3.1
Liberal	Dennis Boothroyd	631	14.9	−9.1
Majority		1,019	24.1	+2.9
Turnout		4,230	34.2	−1.7
Conservative hold		Swing	+1.4	

Nether Shire
Party	Candidate	Votes	%	±%
Labour	Fred Staton	2,664	91.6	−0.1
Communist	Howard Hill	245	8.4	+0.1
Majority		2,419	83.2	−0.2
Turnout		2,909	22.0	−0.1
Labour hold		Swing	-0.1	

Norton
Party	Candidate	Votes	%	±%
Conservative	William Blake	5,150	57.2	+2.6
Labour	Brian Pritchard	3,845	42.7	+8.5
Majority		1,305	14.5	−5.9
Turnout		8,995	36.0	−1.5
Conservative hold		Swing	-2.9	

Owlerton
Party	Candidate	Votes	%	±%
Labour	John Mate	2,148	67.6	+2.5
Conservative	Horace Bestall	915	28.8	+2.2
Communist	Dave Jeffrey	113	3.5	−2.0
Majority		1,233	38.8	+0.4
Turnout		3,176	26.2	−4.0
Labour hold		Swing	+0.1	

Park
Party	Candidate	Votes	%	±%
Labour	Charles Knowles	1,985	80.3	−3.3
Conservative	June Harris	485	19.6	+3.3
Majority		1,500	60.7	−6.7
Turnout		2,470	23.3	−3.7
Labour hold		Swing	-3.3	

Sharrow
Party	Candidate	Votes	%	±%
Labour	Vera Boyd	2,071	56.0	+2.7
Conservative	Joseph Barber	1,623	43.9	+4.0
Majority		448	12.1	−1.4
Turnout		3,694	36.9	−1.2
Labour hold		Swing	-0.6	

Southey Green
Party	Candidate	Votes	%	±%
Labour	Winifred Golding	3,195	90.5	+1.6
Communist	Jim Hudson	333	9.4	−1.6
Majority		2,862	81.1	+3.3
Turnout		3,528	21.0	−1.4
Labour hold		Swing	+1.6	

Tinsley
Party	Candidate	Votes	%	±%
Labour	Norman Eldred	1,842	78.6	+9.7
Conservative	Patricia Santhouse	354	15.1	+3.6
Liberal	Colin Wood	146	6.2	−13.3
Majority		1,488	63.5	14.1
Turnout		2,342	24.1	−7.2
Labour hold		Swing	+3.0	

Walkley
Party	Candidate	Votes	%	±%
Labour	George Cooper	2,004	66.8	+8.4
Conservative	Connie Dodson	996	33.2	−2.0
Majority		1,008	33.6	+10.4
Turnout		3,000	24.9	−6.4
Labour hold		Swing	+5.2	

Woodseats
Party	Candidate	Votes	%	±%
Conservative	Alexander Leitch	3,068	50.3	+0.8
Labour	John Tomlinson	2,640	43.3	+10.0
Liberal	David Turner	391	6.4	−10.8
Majority		428	7.0	−9.2
Turnout		6,099	39.5	+0.8
Conservative hold		Swing	-4.6	

== By-elections between 1964 and 1965 ==
Burngreave By-election 18 June 1964
Party	Candidate	Votes	%	±%
Labour	Reggie Ellis	1,149	69.2	+0.3
Conservative	Frank Adams	512	30.8	−0.3
Majority		637	38.4	+0.5
Turnout		1,661	16.0	−10.0
Labour hold		Swing	+0.3	

Crookesmoor By-election 18 June 1964
Party	Candidate	Votes	%	±%
Labour	John Tomlinson	932	62.8	+4.2
Conservative	Irvine Patnick	399	26.9	−8.2
Liberal	Ken Peace	153	10.3	+10.3
Majority		533	35.9	+12.4
Turnout		1,484	15.8	−7.7
Labour hold		Swing	+6.2	
