= 1965 Sheffield City Council election =

← 1964	13 May 1965	1966 →

29 councillors to Sheffield City Council
	First party	Second party
Party	Labour	Conservative
Seats won	20	9
Seat change	▼1	▲1
Majority party before election
Labour Party (UK)
Majority party after election
Labour Party (UK)

The 1965 Sheffield City Council election was held 13 May 1965. One third of the council was up for election, with as many as four double vacancies in the wards of Crookesmoor, Owlerton, Walkley and Woodseats. The Conservatives managed to gain one of the Walkley seats up for election, as the only gain of the night. Overall turnout fell by a tenth on the previous year's, to 26.2%.

== Election result ==
Sheffield local election result 1965
Party	Seats	Gains	Losses	Net gain/loss	Seats %	Votes %	Votes	+/−
Labour	20	0	1	-1	69.0	46.9	41,975	-8.1
Conservative	9	1	0	+1	31.0	44.4	39,804	+6.1
Liberal	0	0	0	0	0.0	6.3	5,622	+1.6
Communist	0	0	0	0	0.0	2.4	2,144	+0.4

The result had the following consequences for the total number of seats on the Council after the elections:

Party	Previous council		New council	
Party	Cllr	Ald	Cllr	Ald
Labour	55	18	54	18
Conservatives	20	7	21	7
Liberals	0	0	0	0
Communists	0	0	0	0
Total	75	25	75	25
Total	100		100	
Working majority	35	11	33	11
Working majority	46		44	

== Ward results ==
Attercliffe
Party	Candidate	Votes	%	±%
Labour	William Robins	1,430	83.5	+5.1
Conservative	Eric Straw	282	16.5	+3.4
Majority		1,148	67.0	+1.6
Turnout		1,712	13.0	−4.3
Labour hold		Swing	+0.8	

Brightside
Party	Candidate	Votes	%	±%
Labour	Arthur Longmore	1,246	89.2	+4.0
Communist	Barry Bracken	150	10.7	−4.0
Majority		1,096	78.5	+8.0
Turnout		1,396	11.8	−5.6
Labour hold		Swing	+4.0	

Broomhill
Party	Candidate	Votes	%	±%
Conservative	Raymond Hadfield	2,908	63.0	−5.6
Labour	Dennis Dunn	887	19.2	−0.6
Liberal	Robin Young	822	17.8	+6.2
Majority		2,021	43.8	−4.9
Turnout		4,617	34.2	+4.0
Conservative hold		Swing	-2.5	

Burngreave
Party	Candidate	Votes	%	±%
Labour	John Pate	1,374	62.6	−6.3
Conservative	Irvine Patnick	674	30.7	−0.3
Communist	Cyril Morton	147	6.7	+6.7
Majority		700	31.9	−6.0
Turnout		2,195	21.8	−4.2
Labour hold		Swing	-3.0	

Cathedral
Party	Candidate	Votes	%	±%
Labour	Doris Mulhearn	1,492	74.2	−9.1
Conservative	George Beardshaw	519	25.8	+9.1
Majority		973	48.4	−18.2
Turnout		2,011	21.8	−5.1
Labour hold		Swing	-9.1	

Crookesmoor
Party	Candidate	Votes	%	±%
Labour	Brian Pritchard	1,263	48.4	−10.2
Labour	John Tomlinson	1,209		
Conservative	Agnes Edeson	738	28.3	−6.8
Conservative	David Stephenson	725		
Liberal	Peter Metcalfe	399	15.3	+15.3
Liberal	Keith Jackson	386		
Communist	Roy Barrett	209	8.0	+1.8
Majority		471	20.1	−3.4
Turnout		2,609	29.0	+2.4
Labour hold		Swing		
Labour hold		Swing	-1.7	

Darnall
Party	Candidate	Votes	%	±%
Labour	Arnold Wood	1,950	55.8	−3.5
Conservative	Kathleen Circuit	955	27.3	+2.3
Liberal	Joseph Hinchcliffe	366	10.5	+1.1
Communist	Alan Ecclestone	220	6.3	+0.1
Majority		995	28.5	−5.8
Turnout		3,491	19.4	−5.1
Labour hold		Swing	-2.9	

Ecclesall
Party	Candidate	Votes	%	±%
Conservative	Harold Hebblethwaite	4,578	75.6	−7.5
Liberal	Brian Bell	881	14.5	+14.5
Labour	Annie Britton	598	9.9	−7.0
Majority		3,697	61.0	−5.2
Turnout		6,057	36.6	+2.9
Conservative hold		Swing	-11.0	

Firth Park
Party	Candidate	Votes	%	±%
Labour	Harry Hall	1,600	55.9	−4.5
Conservative	Andrew Cook	1,160	40.5	+5.6
Communist	Bob Moody	104	3.6	−1.1
Majority		440	15.3	−10.1
Turnout		2,864	22.7	−7.0
Labour hold		Swing	-5.0	

Hallam
Party	Candidate	Votes	%	±%
Conservative	Gordon Wragg	4,080	63.0	+5.8
Labour	Bernard Kidd	1,404	21.7	−6.3
Liberal	David Chambers	993	15.3	+0.5
Majority		2,676	41.3	+12.1
Turnout		6,477	36.8	−2.4
Conservative hold		Swing	+6.0	

Handsworth
Party	Candidate	Votes	%	±%
Labour	Leonard Cope	2,892	54.4	−2.8
Conservative	Thomas Crewe	1,689	31.8	+3.2
Liberal	Kenneth Peace	730	13.7	−0.3
Majority		1,203	22.6	−6.0
Turnout		5,311	24.2	−4.7
Labour hold		Swing	-3.0	

Heeley
Party	Candidate	Votes	%	±%
Labour	Martha Strafford	2,011	46.8	−9.6
Conservative	Pat Santhouse	1,483	34.5	+4.3
Liberal	Graham Oxley	604	14.0	+3.5
Communist	Edna Ashworth	200	4.6	+1.9
Majority		528	12.3	−13.9
Turnout		4,298	34.0	−4.0
Labour hold		Swing	-6.9	

Hillsborough
Party	Candidate	Votes	%	±%
Conservative	Claude Toplis	2,775	58.4	+7.0
Labour	George Wilson	1,978	41.6	−7.0
Majority		797	16.8	+14.0
Turnout		4,753	34.5	−5.5
Conservative hold		Swing	+7.0	

Manor
Party	Candidate	Votes	%	±%
Labour	George Armitage	2,088	92.0	+1.2
Communist	John Hukin	182	8.0	−1.2
Majority		1,906	84.0	+2.4
Turnout		2,270	14.3	−4.6
Labour hold		Swing	+1.2	

Moor
Party	Candidate	Votes	%	±%
Labour	Reginald Munn	1,334	57.1	−10.9
Conservative	Rupert Bishop	934	40.0	+7.9
Communist	Joe Stevenson	69	2.9	+2.9
Majority		400	17.1	−18.9
Turnout		2,337	24.3	−3.4
Labour hold		Swing	-9.4	

Nether Edge
Party	Candidate	Votes	%	±%
Conservative	Charles Macdonald	2,479	58.7	+4.1
Labour	Valerie Potts	1,069	25.3	−5.2
Liberal	Dennis Boothroyd	675	16.0	+1.1
Majority		1,410	33.4	+9.3
Turnout		4,223	34.7	+0.4
Conservative hold		Swing	+4.6	

Nether Shire
Party	Candidate	Votes	%	±%
Labour	Charles Simms	1,894	92.1	+0.6
Communist	Howard Hill	161	7.8	−0.6
Majority		1,733	84.3	+1.2
Turnout		2,055	15.7	−6.2
Labour hold		Swing	+0.6	

Norton
Party	Candidate	Votes	%	±%
Conservative	Thornton Lambert	5,821	62.2	+5.0
Labour	Frank Hooley	3,529	37.7	−5.0
Majority		2,292	24.5	+10.0
Turnout		9,350	37.1	+1.1
Conservative hold		Swing	+5.0	

Owlerton
Party	Candidate	Votes	%	±%
Labour	Roy Thwaites	1,591	54.0	−13.6
Labour	John Yeardley	1,531		
Conservative	Horace Bestall	1,079	36.6	+7.8
Communist	Dave Jeffery	277	9.4	+5.8
Majority		452	17.4	−21.4
Turnout		2,947	23.5	−2.7
Labour hold		Swing		
Labour hold		Swing	-10.7	

Park
Party	Candidate	Votes	%	±%
Labour	Joseph Ashton	1,509	76.2	−4.1
Conservative	June Harris	325	16.4	−3.2
Communist	George Caborn	145	7.3	+7.3
Majority		1,184	59.8	−0.9
Turnout		1,979	18.6	−4.7
Labour hold		Swing	-0.4	

Sharrow
Party	Candidate	Votes	%	±%
Labour	John Hill	1,711	50.7	−5.3
Conservative	Joseph Barber	1,660	49.2	+5.3
Majority		51	1.5	−10.6
Turnout		3,371	34.7	−2.3
Labour hold		Swing	-5.3	

Southey Green
Party	Candidate	Votes	%	±%
Labour	Hector Bright	2,002	87.7	−2.8
Communist	Raymond Southall	280	12.3	+2.8
Majority		1,722	75.4	−5.7
Turnout		2,282	13.8	−7.1
Labour hold		Swing	-2.8	

Tinsley
Party	Candidate	Votes	%	±%
Labour	Tom Cruise	1,198	70.8	−7.8
Conservative	Joan Willows	341	20.2	+5.0
Liberal	Colin Andrews	152	9.0	+2.7
Majority		857	50.7	−12.8
Turnout		1,691	18.2	−5.8
Labour hold		Swing	-6.4	

Walkley
Party	Candidate	Votes	%	±%
Labour	George Bennett	1,736	52.7	−14.1
Conservative	Raymond Corfield	1,557	47.3	+14.1
Labour	Joe Albaya	1,426		
Majority		131	5.4	−28.1
Turnout		3,293	27.5	+2.6
Labour hold		Swing		
Conservative gain from Labour		Swing	+14.1	

Woodseats
Party	Candidate	Votes	%	±%
Conservative	Frank Adams	3,767	63.2	+12.9
Conservative	Walter Morrison	3,752		
Labour	Marie Hogg	2,189	36.7	−6.5
Labour	F. Smith	1,972		
Majority		1,578	26.5	+19.5
Turnout		5,956	38.5	−1.0
Conservative hold		Swing		
Conservative hold		Swing	+9.7	
