= 1960 Sheffield City Council election =

Election held in England

← 1959	12 May 1960	1961 →

26 councillors to Sheffield City Council
	First party	Second party
Party	Labour	Conservative
Seats won	14	11
Seat change	▼4	▲3
Majority party before election
Labour Party (UK)
Majority party after election
Labour Party (UK)

The 1960 Sheffield local elections were held on 12 May 1960, with one third of the council up for election, as well as a double vacancy for the Ecclesall ward. The elections seen heavy swings against the ruling Labour Party, resulting in four losses and further narrow defends in wards Labour had represented consistently for a considerable amount of time. The seats Labour lost were Heeley, Moor and Sharrow to the Conservative-Liberals and Firth Park became the first ever win for the Ratepayers Association. Weather was blamed for Labour's slump, with one article labelling it as 'the year of Tory weather', recording a low of 25% turnout.

== Election result ==
Sheffield local election result 1960
Party	Seats	Gains	Losses	Net gain/loss	Seats %	Votes %	Votes	+/−
Labour	14	0	4	-4	53.8	43.8	34,107	
Conservative and Liberal Unionist	11	3	0	+3	42.3	52.5	40,869	
Ratepayers Association	1	1	0	+1	3.8	2.2	1,760	
Liberal	0	0	0	0	0.0	1.0	792	
Communist	0	0	0	0	0	0.4	298	

This result has the following consequences for the total number of seats on the Council after the elections:

Party	Previous council		New council	
Party	Cllr	Ald	Cllr	Ald
Labour	54	18	50	17
Conservative-Liberals	21	7	24	8
Ratepayers	0	0	1	0
Liberals	0	0	0	0
Communist	0	0	0	0
Total	75	25	75	25
Total	100		100	
Working majority	33	11	25	9
Working majority	44		34	

== Ward results ==
Attercliffe
Party	Candidate	Votes	%	±%
Labour	G. Goodenough	1,459	73.5	
Conservative and Liberal Unionist	William Keen	525	26.4	
Majority		934	47.1	
Turnout		1,984	13.6	
Labour hold		Swing		

Brightside
Party	Candidate	Votes	%	±%
Labour	Henry Sturrock	Unopposed	N/A	N/A
Majority		N/A	N/A	
Turnout		N/A	N/A	
Labour hold		Swing	N/A	

Broomhill
Party	Candidate	Votes	%	±%
Conservative and Liberal Unionist	Peter Jackson	3,175	81.2	
Labour	J. Birkhead	735	18.8	
Majority		2,440	62.4	
Turnout		3,910	25.3	
Conservative and Liberal Unionist hold		Swing		

Burngreave
Party	Candidate	Votes	%	±%
Labour	J. Thorpe	1,544	62.4	
Conservative and Liberal Unionist	R. Foster	930	37.6	
Majority		614	24.8	
Turnout		2,474	20.4	
Labour hold		Swing		

Cathedral
Party	Candidate	Votes	%	±%
Labour	Enid Hattersley	1,561	72.5	
Conservative and Liberal Unionist	William Blake	591	27.4	
Majority		970	45.1	
Turnout		2,152	19.3	
Labour hold		Swing		

Crookesmoor
Party	Candidate	Votes	%	±%
Labour	Roy Hattersley	1,866	59.1	
Conservative and Liberal Unionist	Gordon Wragg	1,292	40.9	
Majority		574	18.2	
Turnout		3,158	18.2	
Labour hold		Swing		

Darnall
Party	Candidate	Votes	%	±%
Labour	A. Green	2,177	58.9	
Conservative and Liberal Unionist	Kathleen Circuit	1,517	41.1	
Majority		660	17.8	
Turnout		3,694	19.4	
Labour hold		Swing		

Ecclesall
Party	Candidate	Votes	%	±%
Conservative and Liberal Unionist	John Neill	4,396	88.9	
Conservative and Liberal Unionist	Harold Hebblethwaite	4,333		
Labour	Peter Horton	550	11.1	
Majority		3,783	77.8	
Turnout		4,946	30.0	
Conservative and Liberal Unionist hold		Swing		
Conservative and Liberal Unionist hold		Swing		

Firth Park
Party	Candidate	Votes	%	±%
Ratepayers Association	H. Pollard	1,760	53.1	
Labour	Charles Hayward	1,551	46.8	
Majority		209	6.3	
Turnout		3,311	25.3	
Ratepayers Association gain from Labour.		Swing		

Hallam
Party	Candidate	Votes	%	±%
Conservative and Liberal Unionist	Alan Blake	3,541	67.3	
Labour	Roy Munn	929	17.6	
Liberal	Robert Jackson	792	15.0	
Majority		2,612	49.6	
Turnout		5,262	32.2	
Conservative and Liberal Unionist hold		Swing		

Handsworth
Party	Candidate	Votes	%	±%
Labour	George Salmons	2,274	54.6	
Conservative and Liberal Unionist	S. Bell	1,886	45.3	
Majority		388	9.3	
Turnout		4,160	21.7	
Labour hold		Swing		

Heeley
Party	Candidate	Votes	%	±%
Conservative and Liberal Unionist	George Harry Manley	2,064	52.2	
Labour	J. Julian	1,887	47.7	
Majority		177	4.5	
Turnout		3,951	33.5	
Conservative and Liberal Unionist gain from Labour		Swing		

Hillsborough
Party	Candidate	Votes	%	±%
Conservative and Liberal Unionist	A. Siddall	2,958	65.1	
Labour	William Meade	1,588	34.9	
Majority		1,370	30.2	
Turnout		4,546	33.3	
Conservative and Liberal Unionist hold		Swing		

Manor
Party	Candidate	Votes	%	±%
Labour	C. Johnson	2,421	80.1	
Conservative and Liberal Unionist	Robert Lawther	600	19.8	
Majority		1,821	60.3	
Turnout		3,021	18.5	
Labour hold		Swing		

Moor
Party	Candidate	Votes	%	±%
Conservative and Liberal Unionist	H. Maw	1,134	51.4	
Labour	Albert Richardson	1,073	48.6	
Majority		61	2.7	
Turnout		2,207	21.1	
Conservative and Liberal Unionist gain from Labour		Swing		

Nether Edge
Party	Candidate	Votes	%	±%
Conservative and Liberal Unionist	Harry Mercer	2,566	74.6	
Labour	John Yeardley	875	25.4	
Majority		1,691	49.1	
Turnout		3,441	27.2	
Conservative and Liberal Unionist hold		Swing		

Nether Shire
Party	Candidate	Votes	%	±%
Labour	Charles Moseley	Unopposed	N/A	N/A
Majority		N/A	N/A	
Turnout		N/A	N/A	
Labour hold		Swing	N/A	

Norton
Party	Candidate	Votes	%	±%
Conservative and Liberal Unionist	E. Tindall	4,996	68.4	
Labour	C. Price	2,307	31.6	
Majority		2,689	36.8	
Turnout		7,303	31.5	
Conservative and Liberal Unionist hold		Swing		

Owlerton
Party	Candidate	Votes	%	±%
Labour	W. Watson	1,608	53.1	
Conservative and Liberal Unionist	Irvine Patnick	1,421	46.9	
Majority		187	6.2	
Turnout		3,029	24.8	
Labour hold		Swing		

Park
Party	Candidate	Votes	%	±%
Labour	Frances Gathercole	Unopposed	N/A	N/A
Majority		N/A	N/A	
Turnout		N/A	N/A	
Labour hold		Swing	N/A	

Sharrow
Party	Candidate	Votes	%	±%
Conservative and Liberal Unionist	Alexander Leitch	1,812	53.7	
Labour	Percy Robinson	1,564	46.3	
Majority		248	7.4	
Turnout		3,376	29.9	
Conservative and Liberal Unionist gain from Labour		Swing		

Southey Green
Party	Candidate	Votes	%	±%
Labour	Arnold Crosby	2,004	87.0	
Communist	Howard Hill	288	12.9	
Majority		1,716	74.1	
Turnout		2,302	13.1	
Labour hold		Swing		

Tinsley
Party	Candidate	Votes	%	±%
Labour	Tom Lowe	1,313	64.0	
Conservative and Liberal Unionist	W. Baxter	737	35.9	
Majority		576	28.1	
Turnout		2,050	18.3	
Labour hold		Swing		

Walkley
Party	Candidate	Votes	%	±%
Labour	Jack Towns	1,477	50.9	
Conservative and Liberal Unionist	Connie Dodson	1,425	49.1	
Majority		52	1.8	
Turnout		2,902	23.1	
Labour hold		Swing		

Woodseats
Party	Candidate	Votes	%	±%
Conservative and Liberal Unionist	L. Graham	3,303	71.1	
Labour	L. Ward	1,344	28.9	
Majority		1,959	42.2	
Turnout		4,647	31.1	
Conservative and Liberal Unionist hold		Swing		
