= 1961 Sheffield City Council election =

← 1960	11 May 1961	1962 →

25 councillors to Sheffield City Council
	First party	Second party
Party	Labour	Conservative
Seats won	18	7
Seat change	0	0
Majority party before election
Labour Party (UK)
Majority party after election
Labour Party (UK)

The 1961 Sheffield City Council election was held on 11 May 1961, with a third up for election plus a double vacancy in Owlerton. The results were largely a reversal of the previous election; a higher turnout - 35%, up significantly from the previous year's low of 25% - brought a much stronger Labour result with the seats they'd lost the preceding year held comfortably. All seats were contested and successfully defended this year, seeing no change in the make-up of the council.

== Election result ==
Sheffield local election result 1961
Party	Seats	Gains	Losses	Net gain/loss	Seats %	Votes %	Votes	+/−
Labour	18	0	0	0	72.0	50.3	56,101	+6.5
Conservative and Liberal Unionist	7	0	0	0	28.0	42.5	47,426	-10.0
Liberal	0	0	0	0	0.0	2.9	3,263	+1.9
Ratepayers Association	0	0	0	0	0.0	1.9	2,126	-0.3
Communist	0	0	0	0	0.0	1.8	2,043	+1.4
Municipal Reform	0	0	0	0	0.0	0.3	392	+0.3
Union Movement	0	0	0	0	0.0	0.2	164	+0.2

This result had the following consequences for the total number of seats on the Council after the elections:

Party	Previous council		New council	
Party	Cllr	Ald	Cllr	Ald
Labour	50	17	50	17
Conservative-Liberals	24	8	24	8
Ratepayers	1	0	1	0
Liberals	0	0	0	0
Communist	0	0	0	0
Municipal Reform	0	0	0	0
Union Movement	0	0	0	0
Total	75	25	75	25
Total	100		100	
Working majority	25	9	25	9
Working majority	34		34	

== Ward results ==
Attercliffe
Party	Candidate	Votes	%	±%
Labour	Edward Scott	1,865	76.1	+2.6
Conservative and Liberal Unionist	William Keen	584	23.8	−2.6
Majority		1,281	52.3	+5.2
Turnout		2,449	16.9	+3.3
Labour hold		Swing	+2.6	

Brightside
Party	Candidate	Votes	%	±%
Labour	Herbert Redgate	1,937	81.7	N/A
Conservative and Liberal Unionist	Roger Cooke	434	18.3	N/A
Majority		1,503	63.4	N/A
Turnout		2,371	20.4	N/A
Labour hold		Swing	N/A	

Broomhill
Party	Candidate	Votes	%	±%
Conservative and Liberal Unionist	Jack Peile	3,501	79.3	−1.9
Labour	J. Birkhead	912	20.7	+1.9
Majority		2,589	58.7	−3.7
Turnout		4,413	29.0	+3.7
Conservative and Liberal Unionist hold		Swing	-1.9	

Burngreave
Party	Candidate	Votes	%	±%
Labour	Alfred Wild	1,915	65.3	+2.9
Conservative and Liberal Unionist	Dane Clissold	1,018	34.7	−2.9
Majority		897	30.6	+5.7
Turnout		2,933	26.7	+6.3
Labour hold		Swing	+2.9	

Cathedral
Party	Candidate	Votes	%	±%
Labour	George Sharpe	2,084	79.3	+6.8
Conservative and Liberal Unionist	Ivan Harrington	543	20.7	−6.8
Majority		1,541	58.7	+13.6
Turnout		2,627	27.2	+7.9
Labour hold		Swing	+6.8	

Crookesmoor
Party	Candidate	Votes	%	±%
Labour	Jack Watson	2,306	57.8	−1.3
Conservative and Liberal Unionist	Gordon Wragg	1,419	35.5	−5.3
Communist	David Jeffrey	265	6.6	+6.6
Majority		887	22.2	+4.0
Turnout		3,990	35.7	+9.2
Labour hold		Swing	+2.0	

Darnall
Party	Candidate	Votes	%	±%
Labour	William Owen	2,949	60.9	+2.0
Conservative and Liberal Unionist	Noel Taylor	1,454	30.0	−11.0
Communist	William Newton	437	9.0	+9.0
Majority		1,495	30.9	+13.0
Turnout		4,840	25.3	+5.9
Labour hold		Swing	+6.5	

Ecclesall
Party	Candidate	Votes	%	±%
Conservative and Liberal Unionist	Daniel O'Neill	4,812	86.8	−2.1
Labour	Peter Horton	732	13.2	+2.1
Majority		4,080	73.6	−4.2
Turnout		5,544	33.4	+3.3
Conservative and Liberal Unionist hold		Swing	-2.1	

Firth Park
Party	Candidate	Votes	%	±%
Labour	Norman Bentley	2,311	52.1	+5.2
Ratepayers Association	G. Windle	2,126	47.9	−5.2
Majority		185	4.1	−5.2
Turnout		4,437	33.9	+8.6
Labour hold		Swing	+5.2	

Hallam
Party	Candidate	Votes	%	±%
Conservative and Liberal Unionist	Reginald Ashmore	4,357	73.0	+5.7
Labour	R. Day	1,612	27.0	+9.3
Majority		2,745	46.0	−3.6
Turnout		5,969	36.3	+4.2
Conservative and Liberal Unionist hold		Swing	-1.8	

Handsworth
Party	Candidate	Votes	%	±%
Labour	Albert Richardson	3,769	58.0	+3.3
Conservative and Liberal Unionist	S. Bell	2,731	42.0	−3.3
Majority		1,038	16.0	+6.6
Turnout		6,500	33.8	+12.2
Labour hold		Swing	+3.3	

Heeley
Party	Candidate	Votes	%	±%
Labour	John Sewell	2,615	49.3	+1.6
Conservative and Liberal Unionist	John Barraclough	1,866	35.2	−17.0
Liberal	Robert Jackson	818	15.4	+15.4
Majority		749	14.1	+9.6
Turnout		5,299	44.1	+10.7
Labour hold		Swing	+9.3	

Hillsborough
Party	Candidate	Votes	%	±%
Conservative and Liberal Unionist	Kenneth Arnold	3,640	58.9	−6.2
Labour	William Meade	2,153	41.1	+6.2
Majority		932	17.8	−12.3
Turnout		5,238	38.4	+5.1
Conservative and Liberal Unionist hold		Swing	-6.2	

Manor
Party	Candidate	Votes	%	±%
Labour	Austin Conroy	3,640	77.4	−2.7
Conservative and Liberal Unionist	Raymond Hadfield	762	16.2	−3.6
Communist	John Hukin	299	6.3	+6.3
Majority		2,878	61.2	+0.9
Turnout		4,701	29.2	+10.7
Labour hold		Swing	+0.4	

Moor
Party	Candidate	Votes	%	±%
Labour	Florence Roebuck	2,318	63.2	+14.6
Conservative and Liberal Unionist	Robert Lawther	1,346	36.7	−14.6
Majority		972	26.5	+23.7
Turnout		3,664	32.3	+11.2
Labour hold		Swing	+14.6	

Nether Edge
Party	Candidate	Votes	%	±%
Conservative and Liberal Unionist	Lionel Farris	2,598	59.1	−15.4
Labour	Kenneth Brack	1,103	25.1	−0.3
Liberal	Dennis Boothroyd	694	15.8	+15.8
Majority		1,495	34.0	−15.1
Turnout		4,395	35.1	+7.9
Conservative and Liberal Unionist hold		Swing	-7.5	

Nether Shire
Party	Candidate	Votes	%	±%
Labour	Fred Staton	2,422	66.8	N/A
Conservative and Liberal Unionist	Ida Crowther	980	27.0	N/A
Communist	Howard Hill	221	6.1	N/A
Majority		1,442	39.8	N/A
Turnout		3,623	26.6	N/A
Labour hold		Swing	N/A	

Norton
Party	Candidate	Votes	%	±%
Conservative and Liberal Unionist	William Blake	5,620	57.4	−11.0
Labour	Joseph Ashton	3,332	34.0	+2.5
Liberal	Ben Thorpe	832	8.5	+8.5
Majority		2,288	23.4	−13.4
Turnout		9,784	40.4	+8.9
Conservative and Liberal Unionist hold		Swing	-6.7	

Owlerton
Party	Candidate	Votes	%	±%
Labour	John Mate	2,413	57.1	+4.0
Labour	John Yeardley	2,146		
Conservative and Liberal Unionist	Irvine Patnick	1,421	33.6	−13.3
Conservative and Liberal Unionist	Frank Adams	1,140		
Municipal Reform	Harry Hoyle	392	9.3	+9.3
Majority		992	23.5	+17.3
Turnout		4,226	35.2	+10.4
Labour hold		Swing		
Labour hold		Swing	+8.6	

Park
Party	Candidate	Votes	%	±%
Labour	Charles Knowles	2,092	67.6	N/A
Conservative and Liberal Unionist	Alistair Forsyth	706	22.8	N/A
Communist	George Caborn	296	9.6	N/A
Majority		1,386	44.8	N/A
Turnout		3,094	28.2	N/A
Labour hold		Swing	N/A	

Sharrow
Party	Candidate	Votes	%	±%
Labour	Vera Boyd	2,354	52.1	+5.7
Conservative and Liberal Unionist	L. Nicholson	1,615	35.7	−17.9
Liberal	George Swift	330	7.3	+7.3
Communist	John Chapman	221	4.9	+4.9
Majority		739	16.3	+9.0
Turnout		4,520	40.3	+10.4
Labour hold		Swing	+11.8	

Southey Green
Party	Candidate	Votes	%	±%
Labour	Winifred Golding	3,235	73.4	−13.6
Conservative and Liberal Unionist	Gordon Herringshaw	865	19.6	+19.6
Communist	Terence Devey	304	6.9	−6.0
Majority		2,370	53.8	−20.3
Turnout		4,404	25.3	+12.2
Labour hold		Swing	-16.6	

Tinsley
Party	Candidate	Votes	%	±%
Labour	Norman Eldred	2,203	74.1	+10.0
Conservative and Liberal Unionist	W. Baxter	771	25.9	−10.0
Majority		1,432	48.1	+20.0
Turnout		2,974	27.0	+8.7
Labour hold		Swing	+10.0	

Walkley
Party	Candidate	Votes	%	±%
Labour	George Cooper	2,124	57.4	+6.5
Conservative and Liberal Unionist	Connie Dodson	1,410	38.1	−11.0
Union Movement	Francis Hamley	164	4.4	+4.4
Majority		714	19.3	+17.5
Turnout		3,698	29.5	+6.4
Labour hold		Swing	+8.7	

Woodseats
Party	Candidate	Votes	%	±%
Conservative and Liberal Unionist	W. Pallett	3,528	60.6	−10.5
Labour	L. Ward	1,705	29.3	+0.4
Liberal	Colin Wood	589	10.1	+10.1
Majority		1,823	31.3	−10.8
Turnout		5,822	38.3	+7.2
Conservative and Liberal Unionist hold		Swing	-5.4	

== By-elections between 1961 and 1962 ==
Hallam By-election 29 June 1961
Party	Candidate	Votes	%	±%
Conservative and Liberal Unionist	Gordon Wragg	2,063	66.0	−7.0
Liberal	Robert Jackson	1,064	34.0	+34.0
Majority		999	32.0	−14.0
Turnout		3,127	19.0	−13.2
Conservative and Liberal Unionist hold		Swing	-20.5	

Woodseats By-election 29 June 1961
Party	Candidate	Votes	%	±%
Conservative and Liberal Unionist	Robert Lawther	2,088	59.6	−1.0
Labour	L. Ward	829	23.7	−5.6
Liberal	Colin Wood	515	14.7	+4.6
Union Movement	John Wood	70	2.0	+2.0
Majority		1,259	35.9	+4.6
Turnout		3,502	23.0	−15.3
Conservative and Liberal Unionist hold		Swing	+2.3	
