= 1983 Sheffield City Council election =

| ← 1982 | 5 May 1983 | 1984 → |

30 of 87 seats to Sheffield City Council 44 seats needed for a majority
| | First party | Second party | Third party |
|---|---|---|---|
| Party | Labour | Conservative | Alliance |
| Seats won | 21 | 6 | 3 |
| Seat change | ▲1 | 0 | ▼1 |
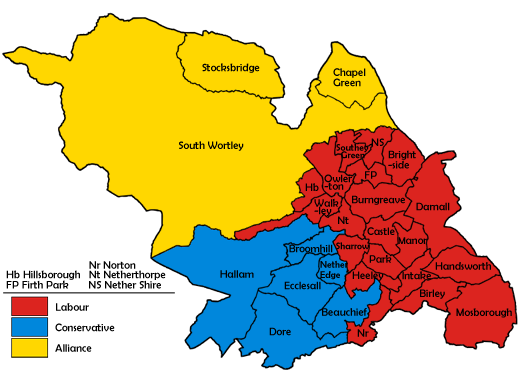
- Map showing the results of the 1983 Sheffield City Council elections.
Majority party before election
Labour Party (UK)
Majority party after election
Labour Party (UK)

Elections to Sheffield City Council were held on 5 May 1983. One third of the council was up for election.

== Election result ==
Sheffield local election result 1983
| Party | Seats | Gains | Losses | Net gain/loss | Seats % | Votes % | Votes | +/− |
|---|---|---|---|---|---|---|---|---|
| Labour | 21 | 2 | 1 | +1 | 70.0 | 50.9 | 91,055 | +2.9 |
| Conservative | 6 | 0 | 0 | 0 | 20.0 | 29.2 | 52,254 | +5.9 |
| Alliance | 3 | 1 | 2 | -1 | 10.0 | 19.7 | 35,257 | -8.6 |
| Communist | 0 | 0 | 0 | 0 | 0.0 | 0.1 | 234 | -0.1 |

This result had the following consequences for the total number of seats on the Council after the elections:

| Party | Previous council | New council |
|---|---|---|
| Labour | 60 | 61 |
| Conservatives | 18 | 18 |
| SDP–Liberal Alliance | 9 | 8 |
| Total | 87 | 87 |
| Working majority | 33 | 35 |

== Ward results ==
Beauchief
| Party | Candidate | Votes | % | ±% |
|---|---|---|---|---|
| Conservative | Cliff Godber* | 4,087 | 53.2 | +11.7 |
| Labour | Val Shepherd | 2,186 | 28.5 | +2.6 |
| Alliance (SDP) | N. Knox | 1,403 | 18.3 | −13.2 |
| Majority | | 2,684 | 24.7 | +14.7 |
| Turnout | | 7,676 | | |
| Conservative hold | | Swing | +4.5 | |

Birley
| Party | Candidate | Votes | % | ±% |
|---|---|---|---|---|
| Labour | Frank White* | 4,130 | 59.7 | +5.1 |
| Conservative | Shirely Rhodes | 1,776 | 25.7 | +8.1 |
| Alliance (SDP) | Roger Davison | 1,011 | 14.6 | −13.2 |
| Majority | | 2,354 | 34.0 | +7.2 |
| Turnout | | 6,917 | | |
| Labour hold | | Swing | -1.5 | |

Brightside
| Party | Candidate | Votes | % | ±% |
|---|---|---|---|---|
| Labour | Bill Michie* | 3,092 | 67.7 | +6.0 |
| Alliance (SDP) | George Wilson | 805 | 17.6 | −12.3 |
| Conservative | Ian Saunders | 667 | 14.6 | +6.3 |
| Majority | | 2,287 | 50.1 | +18.3 |
| Turnout | | 4,564 | | |
| Labour hold | | Swing | +9.1 | |

Broomhill
| Party | Candidate | Votes | % | ±% |
|---|---|---|---|---|
| Conservative | Graham Cheetham* | 2,461 | 48.2 | +4.4 |
| Labour | M. Mitchell | 1,533 | 30.0 | +2.5 |
| Alliance (SDP) | Patrick Smith | 1,110 | 21.7 | −7.0 |
| Majority | | 928 | 18.2 | +3.1 |
| Turnout | | 5,104 | | |
| Conservative hold | | Swing | +0.9 | |

Burngreave
| Party | Candidate | Votes | % | ±% |
|---|---|---|---|---|
| Labour | James Jamison | 3,508 | 52.6 | +1.8 |
| Alliance (Liberal) | Malcolm Johnson* | 2,744 | 41.1 | −1.4 |
| Conservative | Stuart Dawson | 389 | 5.8 | 0.0 |
| Communist | Paul Mackey | 32 | 0.5 | −0.2 |
| Majority | | 764 | 11.5 | +3.2 |
| Turnout | | 6,673 | | |
| Labour gain from Alliance | | Swing | +1.6 | |

Castle
| Party | Candidate | Votes | % | ±% |
|---|---|---|---|---|
| Labour | David Skinner* | 3,804 | 76.8 | +4.8 |
| Conservative | Thomas Seaton | 690 | 13.9 | +3.4 |
| Alliance (SDP) | Tony Pearce | 417 | 8.4 | −8.2 |
| Communist | Violet Gill | 44 | 0.9 | +0.1 |
| Majority | | 3,114 | 62.9 | +7.5 |
| Turnout | | 4,955 | | |
| Labour hold | | Swing | +0.7 | |

Chapel Green
| Party | Candidate | Votes | % | ±% |
|---|---|---|---|---|
| Alliance (Liberal) | Geoffrey Griffiths* | 3,954 | 52.8 | +3.3 |
| Labour | Henry Hanwell | 2,742 | 36.6 | −4.0 |
| Conservative | J. Edwards | 785 | 10.5 | +0.7 |
| Majority | | 1,212 | 16.2 | +7.3 |
| Turnout | | 7,481 | | |
| Alliance hold | | Swing | +3.6 | |

Darnall
| Party | Candidate | Votes | % | ±% |
|---|---|---|---|---|
| Labour | David Brown* | 3,408 | 61.2 | +4.1 |
| Conservative | Colin Cavill | 1,284 | 23.1 | +4.7 |
| Alliance (Liberal) | Dennis Boothroyd | 871 | 15.6 | −8.8 |
| Majority | | 2,124 | 38.1 | +5.4 |
| Turnout | | 5,563 | | |
| Labour hold | | Swing | -0.3 | |

Dore
| Party | Candidate | Votes | % | ±% |
|---|---|---|---|---|
| Conservative | Patricia Davey | 4,786 | 59.1 | +7.2 |
| Labour | A. Morgan | 1,926 | 23.8 | +1.1 |
| Alliance (SDP) | W. Lawrie | 1,382 | 17.1 | −8.3 |
| Majority | | 2,860 | 35.3 | +8.8 |
| Turnout | | 8,094 | | |
| Conservative hold | | Swing | +3.0 | |

Ecclesall
| Party | Candidate | Votes | % | ±% |
|---|---|---|---|---|
| Conservative | John Neill* | 4,761 | 60.4 | +7.7 |
| Alliance (Liberal) | Arthur Fawthrop | 1,895 | 24.0 | −9.4 |
| Labour | L. Skinner | 1,228 | 15.6 | +1.7 |
| Majority | | 2,866 | 36.4 | +17.1 |
| Turnout | | 7,884 | | |
| Conservative hold | | Swing | +8.5 | |

Firth Park
| Party | Candidate | Votes | % | ±% |
|---|---|---|---|---|
| Labour | Terry Butler* | 3,941 | 72.6 | +0.3 |
| Alliance (Liberal) | D. Wagland | 824 | 15.2 | −3.7 |
| Conservative | Lorna Banham | 661 | 12.2 | +3.5 |
| Majority | | 3,117 | 57.4 | −4.0 |
| Turnout | | 5,426 | | |
| Labour hold | | Swing | +2.0 | |

Hallam
| Party | Candidate | Votes | % | ±% |
|---|---|---|---|---|
| Conservative | R. Hobson* | 4,319 | 59.4 | +5.8 |
| Alliance (Liberal) | Peter McNutt | 1,739 | 23.9 | −6.3 |
| Labour | Dorothy Podlesny | 1,205 | 16.6 | +0.5 |
| Majority | | 2,580 | 35.5 | +12.1 |
| Turnout | | 7,263 | | |
| Conservative hold | | Swing | +6.0 | |

Handsworth
| Party | Candidate | Votes | % | ±% |
|---|---|---|---|---|
| Labour | Elsie Smith* | 3,654 | 61.5 | +4.5 |
| Conservative | Dorothy Kennedy | 1,395 | 23.5 | +6.6 |
| Alliance (SDP) | Hilary Gooch | 892 | 15.0 | −10.9 |
| Majority | | 2,259 | 38.0 | +6.9 |
| Turnout | | 5,941 | | |
| Labour hold | | Swing | -1.0 | |

Heeley
| Party | Candidate | Votes | % | ±% |
|---|---|---|---|---|
| Labour | S. Clarke | 3,744 | 56.0 | +6.8 |
| Conservative | A. Byron | 2,047 | 30.6 | +4.5 |
| Alliance (SDP) | Robert Scholfield | 889 | 13.3 | −10.2 |
| Majority | | 1,697 | 25.4 | +2.3 |
| Turnout | | 6,680 | | |
| Labour hold | | Swing | +1.1 | |

Hillsborough
| Party | Candidate | Votes | % | ±% |
|---|---|---|---|---|
| Labour | D. Morgan* | 3,578 | 45.7 | +2.3 |
| Conservative | William Travis | 2,745 | 35.1 | +10.0 |
| Alliance (Liberal) | Patrick Smith | 1,500 | 19.2 | −12.2 |
| Majority | | 833 | 10.6 | −1.4 |
| Turnout | | 7,823 | | |
| Labour hold | | Swing | -3.8 | |

Intake
| Party | Candidate | Votes | % | ±% |
|---|---|---|---|---|
| Labour | Mike Bower* | 3,684 | 57.6 | +4.0 |
| Conservative | Farrell Rollitt | 1,754 | 27.4 | +7.5 |
| Alliance (SDP) | A. Lyon | 957 | 14.9 | −11.5 |
| Majority | | 1,930 | 30.2 | +3.0 |
| Turnout | | 6,395 | | |
| Labour hold | | Swing | -1.7 | |

Manor
| Party | Candidate | Votes | % | ±% |
|---|---|---|---|---|
| Labour | Paul Colk | 3,564 | 79.4 | +8.1 |
| Conservative | Frank Brookes | 521 | 11.6 | +3.3 |
| Alliance (SDP) | Joan Dallamore | 376 | 8.4 | −11.2 |
| Communist | B. Oldale | 27 | 0.6 | −0.1 |
| Majority | | 3,043 | 67.8 | +16.1 |
| Turnout | | 4,488 | | |
| Labour hold | | Swing | +2.4 | |

Mosborough
| Party | Candidate | Votes | % | ±% |
|---|---|---|---|---|
| Labour | S. Dootson* | 3,993 | 57.5 | +1.4 |
| Conservative | Christopher Goldsmith | 1,908 | 27.5 | +9.5 |
| Alliance (SDP) | I. Addison | 1,043 | 15.0 | −10.9 |
| Majority | | 2,085 | 30.0 | −0.2 |
| Turnout | | 6,944 | | |
| Labour hold | | Swing | -4.0 | |

Nether Edge
| Party | Candidate | Votes | % | ±% |
|---|---|---|---|---|
| Conservative | Paul Verhaert* | 2,843 | 44.9 | +2.6 |
| Labour | John Hesketh | 2,456 | 38.7 | +3.0 |
| Alliance (SDP) | Paul Metcalfe | 1,037 | 16.3 | −5.6 |
| Majority | | 387 | 6.2 | −0.4 |
| Turnout | | 6,336 | | |
| Conservative hold | | Swing | -0.2 | |

Nether Shire
| Party | Candidate | Votes | % | ±% |
|---|---|---|---|---|
| Labour | Stephen Jones | 3,706 | 68.3 | +2.3 |
| Alliance (SDP) | Robert Shillito | 907 | 16.7 | −5.9 |
| Conservative | Patricia Oldfield | 810 | 14.9 | +6.1 |
| Majority | | 2,799 | 51.6 | +8.2 |
| Turnout | | 5,423 | | |
| Labour hold | | Swing | +4.1 | |

Netherthorpe
| Party | Candidate | Votes | % | ±% |
|---|---|---|---|---|
| Labour | Harold Lambert* | 3,231 | 66.8 | +6.6 |
| Conservative | G. Ranson | 1,007 | 20.8 | +5.5 |
| Alliance (Liberal) | S. Matthewman | 542 | 11.2 | −12.0 |
| Communist | Gordon Ashberry | 57 | 1.2 | −0.1 |
| Majority | | 2,224 | 46.0 | +9.0 |
| Turnout | | 4,837 | | |
| Labour hold | | Swing | +0.5 | |

Norton
| Party | Candidate | Votes | % | ±% |
|---|---|---|---|---|
| Labour | B. Glenn* | 3,880 | 59.5 | +1.9 |
| Conservative | B. Farnsworth | 1,907 | 29.2 | +6.6 |
| Alliance (Liberal) | Robert Mumford | 731 | 11.2 | −8.6 |
| Majority | | 1,973 | 30.3 | −4.7 |
| Turnout | | 6,518 | | |
| Labour hold | | Swing | -2.3 | |

Owlerton
| Party | Candidate | Votes | % | ±% |
|---|---|---|---|---|
| Labour | Helen Jackson* | 3,464 | 68.6 | +5.6 |
| Conservative | George Booth | 963 | 19.0 | +6.6 |
| Alliance (Liberal) | Philip Taylor | 623 | 12.3 | −12.2 |
| Majority | | 2,501 | 49.6 | +11.1 |
| Turnout | | 5,050 | | |
| Labour hold | | Swing | -0.5 | |

Park
| Party | Candidate | Votes | % | ±% |
|---|---|---|---|---|
| Labour | Vivienne Nicholson | 3,937 | 83.3 | +7.6 |
| Conservative | Jeremy Richardson | 786 | 16.6 | +7.4 |
| Majority | | 3,151 | 66.7 | +5.0 |
| Turnout | | 4,723 | | |
| Labour hold | | Swing | +0.1 | |

Sharrow
| Party | Candidate | Votes | % | ±% |
|---|---|---|---|---|
| Labour | Howard Knight* | 2,934 | 63.3 | +0.5 |
| Conservative | Anne Smith | 1,052 | 22.7 | +5.6 |
| Alliance (SDP) | E. Scott | 571 | 12.3 | −6.4 |
| Communist | M. Heywood | 74 | 1.6 | +0.3 |
| Majority | | 1,882 | 40.6 | −4.5 |
| Turnout | | 4,631 | | |
| Labour hold | | Swing | -2.5 | |

South Wortley
| Party | Candidate | Votes | % | ±% |
|---|---|---|---|---|
| Alliance (Liberal) | David Baker | 3,287 | 38.5 | -5.8 |
| Conservative | Sylvia Cowley | 2,634 | 30.8 | +5.9 |
| Labour | Patrick Heath | 2,618 | 30.6 | −0.1 |
| Majority | | 633 | 7.7 | −5.9 |
| Turnout | | 8,539 | | |
| Alliance gain from Labour | | Swing | -5.8 | |

Southey Green
| Party | Candidate | Votes | % | ±% |
|---|---|---|---|---|
| Labour | Sandra Davies* | 4,106 | 81.6 | +6.8 |
| Alliance (SDP) | Pamela Brown | 468 | 9.3 | −9.0 |
| Conservative | Hedley Oldfield | 455 | 9.0 | +2.2 |
| Majority | | 3,638 | 72.3 | +15.8 |
| Turnout | | 5,029 | | |
| Labour hold | | Swing | +7.9 | |

Stocksbridge
| Party | Candidate | Votes | % | ±% |
|---|---|---|---|---|
| Labour | Ann Proctor | 2,081 | 39.1 | +2.8 |
| Alliance (Liberal) | M. Shaw | 2,031 | 38.1 | -6.6 |
| Alliance (Liberal) | June Hibberd | 1,934 | | |
| Labour | John Johnston | 1,920 | | |
| Conservative | Barrie Jones | 1,213 | 22.8 | +3.8 |
| Conservative | R. Homer | 1,059 | | |
| Majority | | 97 | 1.0 | −7.4 |
| Turnout | | 5,325 | | |
| Labour gain from Alliance | | Swing | | |
| Alliance hold | | Swing | +4.7 | |

Walkley
| Party | Candidate | Votes | % | ±% |
|---|---|---|---|---|
| Labour | William Owen* | 3,722 | 57.1 | +3.6 |
| Conservative | Radcliffe Wilson-Wolfe | 1,548 | 23.7 | +7.3 |
| Alliance (SDP) | Dennis Brown | 1,248 | 19.1 | −10.9 |
| Majority | | 2,174 | 33.4 | +9.9 |
| Turnout | | 6,518 | | |
| Labour hold | | Swing | -1.8 | |
