= 1982 Sheffield City Council election =

← 1980	6 May 1982	1983 →

29 of 87 seats to Sheffield City Council 44 seats needed for a majority
	First party	Second party	Third party
Party	Labour	Conservative	Alliance
Seats won	20	6	3
Seat change	0	0	0
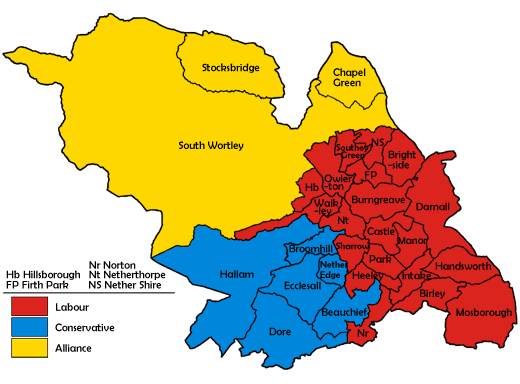
- Map showing the results of the 1982 Sheffield City Council elections.
Majority party before election
Labour Party (UK)
Majority party after election
Labour Party (UK)

Elections to Sheffield City Council were held on 6 May 1982. One third of the council was up for election.

== Election result ==
Sheffield local election result 1982
Party	Seats	Gains	Losses	Net gain/loss	Seats %	Votes %	Votes	+/−
Labour	20	1	1	0	68.9	48.0	79,719	-4.9
Alliance	3	1	1	0	10.3	28.3	46,997	+16.0
Conservative	6	0	0	0	20.7	23.3	38,765	-10.7
Communist	0	0	0	0	0.0	0.2	388	-0.4
Independent	0	0	0	0	0.0	0.1	163	N/A
Workers Revolutionary	0	0	0	0	0.0	0.0	6	N/A

This result had the following consequences for the total number of seats on the Council after the elections:

Party	Previous council	New council
Labour	60	60
Conservatives	18	18
SDP–Liberal Alliance	9	9
Total	87	87
Working majority	33	33

== Ward results ==
Beauchief
Party	Candidate	Votes	%	±%
Conservative	Sween Batiste*	2,964	41.5	−24.4
Alliance	Neil Panter	2,251	31.5	+31.5
Labour	Justin Wren-Lewis	1,847	25.9	−8.1
Independent	John Charles	75	1.0	+1.0
Majority		713	10.0	−21.9
Turnout		7,137		
Conservative hold		Swing	-27.9	

Birley
Party	Candidate	Votes	%	±%
Labour	John Marshall*	3,420	54.6	−11.9
Alliance	Roger Davison	1,740	27.8	+27.8
Conservative	Glenda Leitch	1,104	17.6	−15.9
Majority		1,680	26.8	−6.2
Turnout		6,264		
Labour hold		Swing	-19.8	

Brightside
Party	Candidate	Votes	%	±%
Labour	Rae Whitfield	2,919	61.7	−14.1
Alliance	George Wilson*	1,417	29.9	+29.9
Conservative	Victoria Sellers	393	8.3	−15.8
Majority		1,502	31.8	−19.9
Turnout		4,729		
Labour hold		Swing	-22.0	

George Wilson was previously elected as a Labour councillor

Broomhill
Party	Candidate	Votes	%	±%
Conservative	Marvyn Moore*	2,058	43.8	−6.5
Alliance	Martin Hayes-Allen	1,346	28.7	+3.7
Labour	Brian Fischer	1,290	27.5	+2.8
Majority		712	15.1	−10.2
Turnout		4,694		
Conservative hold		Swing	-5.1	

Burngreave
Party	Candidate	Votes	%	±%
Labour	Tony Damms	3,089	50.8	+11.7
Alliance	David Johnson*	2,586	42.5	−8.9
Conservative	Shirely Rhodes	351	5.8	−1.5
Communist	Stephen Howell	46	0.7	−1.4
Workers Revolutionary	Keith McCormick	6	0.1	+0.1
Majority		503	8.3	−4.0
Turnout		6,078		
Labour gain from Alliance		Swing	+10.3	

Castle
Party	Candidate	Votes	%	±%
Labour	Peter Horton*	3,252	72.0	−3.0
Alliance	Tony Pearce	752	16.6	+11.0
Conservative	Joan Graham	474	10.5	−6.0
Communist	Violet Gill	36	0.8	−2.0
Majority		2,500	55.4	−3.1
Turnout		4,514		
Labour hold		Swing	-7.0	

Chapel Green
Party	Candidate	Votes	%	±%
Alliance	Roger Wilson*	3,236	49.5	−11.5
Labour	Henry Hanwell**	2,658	40.6	+9.5
Conservative	Francis Brookes	645	9.8	+2.0
Majority		578	8.9	−21.0
Turnout		6,539		
Alliance hold		Swing	-10.5	

Henry Hanwell was a sitting councillor for South Wortley

Darnall
Party	Candidate	Votes	%	±%
Labour	Roy Munn*	2,770	57.1	−5.6
Alliance	Dennis Boothroyd	1,185	24.4	+12.7
Conservative	Colin Cavill	895	18.4	−7.2
Majority		1,585	32.7	−4.4
Turnout		4,850		
Labour hold		Swing	-9.1	

Dore
Party	Candidate	Votes	%	±%
Conservative	Jack Joel Thompson*	3,870	51.9	−12.0
Alliance	Edward Mullin	1,894	25.4	+15.8
Labour	Donald Lemons**	1,695	22.7	−3.8
Majority		1,976	26.5	−10.9
Turnout		7,459		
Conservative hold		Swing	-13.9	

Donald Lemons was a sitting councillor for Heeley ward

Ecclesall
Party	Candidate	Votes	%	±%
Conservative	Jonathan Freeman*	3,827	52.7	−17.1
Alliance	Arthur Fawthrop	2,423	33.4	+19.1
Labour	Anthony Sweeney	1,009	13.9	−1.9
Majority		1,404	19.3	−34.7
Turnout		7,259		
Conservative hold		Swing	-18.1	

Firth Park
Party	Candidate	Votes	%	±%
Labour	Joan Barton*	3,710	72.3	−8.8
Alliance	Christopher Fenn	972	18.9	+11.0
Conservative	Lorna Banham	447	8.7	−3.3
Majority		2,738	53.4	−15.7
Turnout		5,129		
Labour hold		Swing	-9.9	

Hallam
Party	Candidate	Votes	%	±%
Conservative	Gordon Wragg*	3,620	53.6	−13.7
Alliance	Paul Metcalfe	2,036	30.2	+18.0
Labour	Dorothy Podlesny**	1,090	16.1	−4.4
Majority		1,584	23.4	−23.4
Turnout		6,746		
Conservative hold		Swing	-15.8	

Dorothy Podlesny was a sitting councillor for Southey Green

Handsworth
Party	Candidate	Votes	%	±%
Labour	Leslie Mose	3,092	57.0	−13.3
Alliance	Hilary Gooch	1,407	25.9	+25.9
Conservative	Bernard Kennedy	919	16.9	−12.7
Majority		1,685	31.1	−9.6
Turnout		5,418		
Labour hold		Swing	-19.6	

Heeley
Party	Candidate	Votes	%	±%
Labour	Mukesh Savani	2,803	49.2	−9.8
Conservative	Sidney Cordle	1,488	26.1	−5.9
Alliance	Donald Smith	1,339	23.5	+16.7
Communist	Neville Taylor	68	1.2	−0.9
Majority		1,315	23.1	−3.9
Turnout		5,698		
Labour hold		Swing	-1.9	

Hillsborough
Party	Candidate	Votes	%	±%
Labour	Gordon Mills*	3,363	43.4	−9.9
Alliance	June Hibberd**	2,432	31.4	+31.4
Conservative	William Travis	1,943	25.1	−21.6
Majority		931	12.0	+5.4
Turnout		7,738		
Labour hold		Swing	-20.6	

June Hibberd was a sitting councillor for Stocksbridge

Intake
Party	Candidate	Votes	%	±%
Labour	David Green	3,174	53.6	−6.2
Alliance	Ted Lyon	1,560	26.4	+18.5
Conservative	Farrell Rollitt	1,181	19.9	−12.3
Majority		1,614	27.2	−0.4
Turnout		5,915		
Labour hold		Swing	-12.3	

Manor
Party	Candidate	Votes	%	±%
Labour	Howard Capelin	2,912	71.3	−4.8
Alliance	Joan Dallamore	801	19.6	+13.4
Conservative	Simon Briggs	341	8.3	−5.9
Communist	Arnold Archer	28	0.7	−2.8
Majority		2,111	51.7	−9.1
Turnout		4,082		
Labour hold		Swing	-9.1	

Mosborough
Party	Candidate	Votes	%	±%
Labour	Sam Wall**	3,293	56.1	−15.8
Alliance	Dennis Vernals	1,519	25.9	+25.9
Conservative	Christopher Goldsmith	1,058	18.0	−10.0
Majority		1,774	30.2	−13.7
Turnout		5,870		
Labour hold		Swing	-20.8	

Sam Wall was a sitting councillor for Norton ward

Nether Edge
Party	Candidate	Votes	%	±%
Conservative	Christine Smith*	2,434	42.3	−11.4
Labour	Marilyn Tsiorvas	2,054	35.7	−0.5
Alliance	David Tummon	1,258	21.9	+11.9
Majority		380	6.6	−10.9
Turnout		5,746		
Conservative hold		Swing	-5.4	

Nether Shire
Party	Candidate	Votes	%	±%
Labour	Alan Wigfield*	3,442	66.0	−11.1
Alliance	Robert Shillito	1,179	22.6	+22.6
Conservative	Patricia Oldfield	462	8.8	−11.1
Independent	Joe Williams	88	1.7	+1.7
Communist	Paul Mackey	41	0.8	−2.1
Majority		2,263	43.4	−13.8
Turnout		5,212		
Labour hold		Swing	-16.8	

Netherthorpe
Party	Candidate	Votes	%	±%
Labour	John Laurent*	2,865	60.2	−10.6
Alliance	Peter Stubbs	1,106	23.2	+19.6
Conservative	Radcliffe Wilson-Wolfe	727	15.3	−10.2
Communist	Valerie Seabright	62	1.3	+1.3
Majority		1,759	37.0	−8.3
Turnout		4,760		
Labour hold		Swing	-15.1	

Norton
Party	Candidate	Votes	%	±%
Labour	James Moore	3,419	57.6	−4.0
Conservative	Paul Mort	1,341	22.6	−7.6
Alliance	Robert Mumford	1,173	19.8	+11.6
Majority		2,078	35.0	+3.6
Turnout		5,933		
Labour hold		Swing	+1.8	

Owlerton
Party	Candidate	Votes	%	±%
Labour	George Mathews	3,000	63.0	−11.6
Alliance	Robert Scholfield	1,168	24.5	+24.5
Conservative	Dorothy Kennedy	591	12.4	−10.9
Majority		1,832	38.5	−12.8
Turnout		4,759		
Labour hold		Swing	-18.0	

Park
Party	Candidate	Votes	%	±%
Labour	Doris Mulhearn*	3,253	75.7	−8.5
Alliance	Stephen Truslove	601	14.0	+14.0
Conservative	Thomas Seaton	395	9.2	−3.8
Communist	David Bruce	45	1.0	−1.8
Majority		2,652	61.7	−9.5
Turnout		4,294		
Labour hold		Swing	-11.2	

Sharrow
Party	Candidate	Votes	%	±%
Labour	Tony Tigwell	2,993	62.8	−1.8
Alliance	Christopher Walker	892	18.7	+18.7
Conservative	George Booth	815	17.1	−14.7
Communist	Brian Turley	62	1.3	−2.2
Majority		2,101	44.1	+11.3
Turnout		4,762		
Labour hold		Swing	-10.2	

South Wortley
Party	Candidate	Votes	%	±%
Alliance	Philip Howson	3,774	44.3	+18.3
Labour	Ruth Blunkett	2,616	30.7	−8.2
Conservative	Sylvia Cowley	2,123	24.9	−10.1
Majority		1,158	13.6	+10.3
Turnout		8,513		
Alliance gain from Labour		Swing	+13.2	

Southey Green
Party	Candidate	Votes	%	±%
Labour	John Stent	3,488	74.8	−12.9
Alliance	Stewart Dalton	854	18.3	+18.3
Conservative	Hedley Oldfield	318	6.8	−5.4
Majority		2,634	56.5	−19.0
Turnout		4,660		
Labour hold		Swing	-15.6	

Stocksbridge
Party	Candidate	Votes	%	±%
Alliance	Malcolm Brelsford	2,166	44.7	−7.5
Labour	Ann Proctor	1,759	36.3	+11.8
Conservative	Barrie Jones	922	19.0	−4.3
Majority		407	8.4	−19.3
Turnout		4,847		
Alliance hold		Swing	-9.6	

Walkley
Party	Candidate	Votes	%	±%
Labour	Peter Wood*	3,444	53.5	−12.4
Alliance	Jane Padget	1,930	30.0	+30.0
Conservative	Stuart Dawson	1,059	16.4	−17.6
Majority		1,514	23.5	−8.4
Turnout		6,433		
Labour hold		Swing	-21.2	
