= 1980 Sheffield City Council election =

← 1979	1 May 1980	1982 →

All 87 seats to Sheffield City Council 44 seats needed for a majority
	First party	Second party	Third party
Party	Labour	Conservative	Liberal
Seats won	60	18	9
Seat change	▲1	▼4	▲3
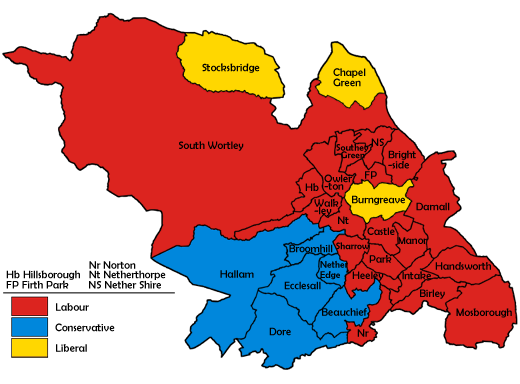
- Map showing the results of the 1980 Sheffield City Council elections.
Majority party before election
Labour Party (UK)
Majority party after election
Labour Party (UK)

Elections to Sheffield City Council were held on 1 May 1980. The whole council was up for election, with the Attercliffe ward now merged into Darnall and Gleadless ward changed to Norton.

== Election result ==
Sheffield local election result 1980
Party	Seats	Gains	Losses	Net gain/loss	Seats %	Votes %	Votes	+/−
Labour	60	4	3	+1	68.9	52.9	85,603	+0.1
Conservative	18	0	4	-4	20.7	34.0	55,079	-1.3
Liberal	9	3	0	+3	10.3	12.3	19,933	+0.9
Communist	0	0	0	0	0.0	0.6	938	+0.2
S.D.P.	0	0	0	0	0.0	0.1	168	N/A
National Front	0	0	0	0	0.0	0.1	88	N/A

This result had the following consequences for the total number of seats on the Council after the elections:

Party	Previous council	New council
Labour	62	60
Conservatives	22	18
Liberal	6	9
Communist	0	0
S.D.P.	0	0
National Front	0	0
Total	90	87
Working majority	34	33

== Ward results ==
Beauchief
Party	Candidate	Votes	%	±%
Conservative	Danny George*	4,487	65.9	−3.4
Conservative	Cliff Godber*	4,389		
Conservative	Susan Batiste*	4,377		
Labour	D. Hutchinson	2,315	34.0	+3.3
Labour	G. Hague	2,290		
Labour	P. Reading	2,231		
Majority		2,062	31.9	−6.7
Turnout		6,667	46.4	
Conservative hold		Swing		
Conservative hold		Swing		
Conservative hold		Swing	-3.3	

Birley
Party	Candidate	Votes	%	±%
Labour	George Fisher*	3,567	66.5	+5.3
Labour	Frank White	3,557		
Labour	John Marshall*	3,547		
Conservative	B. Lomas	1,799	33.5	+5.0
Conservative	J. Young	1,766		
Conservative	R. Kelsey	1,740		
Majority		1,748	33.0	+0.3
Turnout		5,366	36.6	
Labour hold		Swing		
Labour hold		Swing		
Labour hold		Swing	+0.1	

Brightside
Party	Candidate	Votes	%	±%
Labour	Peter Price*	2,570	75.8	+8.6
Labour	Bill Michie*	2,510		
Labour	George Wilson*	2,452		
Conservative	Victoria Sellers	819	24.1	+1.8
Conservative	Gordon Millward	756		
Conservative	John Chapman	739		
Majority		1,633	51.7	+6.8
Turnout		3,389	30.8	
Labour hold		Swing		
Labour hold		Swing		
Labour hold		Swing	+3.4	

Broomhill
Party	Candidate	Votes	%	±%
Conservative	Irvine Patnick*	2,438	50.3	+1.4
Conservative	Graham Cheetham*	2,406		
Conservative	Marvyn Moore*	2,381		
Liberal	Martin Hayes-Allen	1,211	25.0	+5.1
Labour	Joan Brown*	1,197	24.7	−6.5
Labour	J. Relton	1,160		
Liberal	E. Huntley	1,138		
Labour	T. Treffry	1,130		
Liberal	J. Holmes	1,082		
Majority		1,170	25.3	+7.6
Turnout		4,846	37.8	
Conservative hold		Swing		
Conservative hold		Swing		
Conservative hold		Swing	-1.8	

Burngreave
Party	Candidate	Votes	%	±%
Liberal	Francis Butler*	3,002	51.4	+11.4
Liberal	Malcolm Johnson*	2,713		
Liberal	David Johnson	2,678		
Labour	F. Woodbine*	2,286	39.1	−5.2
Labour	B. Bush	2,180		
Labour	G. Machin	2,073		
Conservative	Moira Hattersley	428	7.3	−6.9
Conservative	Colin Barnsley	421		
Conservative	I. Dudley	417		
Communist	Stephen Howell	123	2.1	+0.7
Majority		392	12.3	+8.0
Turnout		5839	43.8	
Liberal hold		Swing		
Liberal hold		Swing		
Liberal gain from Labour		Swing	+8.3	

Castle
Party	Candidate	Votes	%	±%
Labour	Reg Munn*	3,222	75.0	+0.1
Labour	David Skinner*	3,152		
Labour	Peter Horton*	3,146		
Conservative	Katherine Pinder	712	16.5	−0.3
Conservative	A. Saunders	697		
Conservative	Ian Saunders	681		
Liberal	Christopher Fenn	241	5.6	−1.3
Liberal	E. Fenn	238		
Communist	J. Hudson	122	2.8	+1.5
Majority		2,434	58.5	+0.4
Turnout		4,297	29.7	
Labour hold		Swing		
Labour hold		Swing		
Labour hold		Swing	+0.2	

Chapel Green
Party	Candidate	Votes	%	±%
Liberal	David Chadwick*	4,334	61.0	+8.3
Liberal	Geoffrey Griffiths*	4,010		
Liberal	Roger Wilson	3,595		
Labour	Tom Steel	2,207	31.1	+2.6
Labour	G. Birch	2,022		
Labour	Lawrence Kingham	2,007		
Conservative	E. Holmes	556	7.8	−11.0
Conservative	F. Meakin	536		
Conservative	D. Meakin	523		
Majority		1,388	29.9	+5.7
Turnout		7,097		
Liberal hold		Swing		
Liberal hold		Swing		
Liberal hold		Swing	+2.8	

Darnall
Party	Candidate	Votes	%	±%
Labour	Frank Prince*	3,096	62.7	+2.8
Labour	David Brown*	3,081		
Labour	George Munn*	3,009		
Conservative	Colin Cavill	1,264	25.6	−2.6
Conservative	Shirley Rhodes	1,238		
Conservative	Dorothy Kennedy	1,237		
Liberal	Dennis Boothroyd	577	11.7	−0.1
Liberal	M. Francis	576		
Liberal	Michael Ogden	512		
Majority		1,745	37.1	+5.4
Turnout		4,937	34.1	
Labour hold		Swing		
Labour hold		Swing		
Labour hold		Swing	+2.7	

Dore
Party	Candidate	Votes	%	±%
Conservative	David Heslop*	4,737	63.9	−3.1
Conservative	Pat Santhouse*	4,653		
Conservative	Jack Thompson*	4,473		
Labour	Angela Smith	1,965	26.5	−6.5
Labour	Win Francis	1,963		
Labour	A. Lyne	1,926		
Liberal	C. Holmes	713	9.6	+9.6
Liberal	Edward Mullin	578		
Liberal	T. Robinson	567		
Majority		2,508	37.4	+3.4
Turnout		7,415	46.1	
Conservative hold		Swing		
Conservative hold		Swing		
Conservative hold		Swing	+1.7	

Ecclesall
Party	Candidate	Votes	%	±%
Conservative	William Dunsmore*	4,959	69.8	+8.8
Conservative	John Neill*	4,899		
Conservative	Jonathan Freeman	4,844		
Labour	D. Lyons	1,125	15.8	−0.9
Labour	D. Payne	1,100		
Labour	L. Skinner	1,085		
Liberal	Arthur Fawthrop	1,020	14.3	−7.9
Liberal	P. Cruickshank	980		
Liberal	J. Laming	973		
Majority		3,719	54.0	+15.2
Turnout		7,104	46.5	
Conservative hold		Swing		
Conservative hold		Swing		
Conservative hold		Swing	+4.8	

Firth Park
Party	Candidate	Votes	%	±%
Labour	Clive Betts*	4,448	81.1	+13.6
Labour	Terry Butler*	4,218		
Labour	Joan Barton*	4,174		
Conservative	Lorna Banham	657	12.0	−8.9
Conservative	H. Bailey	648		
Conservative	B. Tomlinson	620		
Liberal	B. Goodison	434	7.9	−3.6
Liberal	K. Howson	376		
Liberal	G. Trickett*	354		
Majority		3,517	69.1	+22.5
Turnout		5,481	39.4	
Labour hold		Swing		
Labour hold		Swing		
Labour hold		Swing	+11.2	

Hallam
Party	Candidate	Votes	%	±%
Conservative	Peter Jackson*	4,485	67.3	+10.6
Conservative	R. Hobson*	4,365		
Conservative	Gordon Wragg*	4,357		
Labour	Dennis Brown	1,368	20.5	−9.9
Labour	E. Ellis	1,359		
Labour	A. Bacon	1,314		
Liberal	Jean Mason	812	12.2	−0.6
Liberal	G. Jacobs	761		
Liberal	A. Tonge	738		
Majority		2,989	46.8	+20.5
Turnout		6,665	47.2	
Conservative hold		Swing		
Conservative hold		Swing		
Conservative hold		Swing	+10.2	

Handsworth
Party	Candidate	Votes	%	±%
Labour	George Nicholls*	3,595	70.3	+3.1
Labour	Elsie Smith*	3,576		
Labour	Janet Fiore	3,511		
Conservative	Bernard Kennedy	1,514	29.6	−3.1
Conservative	Evelyn Millward	1,459		
Conservative	J. Dunsmore	1,402		
Majority		1,997	40.7	+6.2
Turnout		5,109	36.3	
Labour hold		Swing		
Labour hold		Swing		
Labour hold		Swing	+3.1	

Heeley
Party	Candidate	Votes	%	±%
Labour	Winifred Golding*	3,948	59.0	+2.2
Labour	John Senior*	3,932		
Labour	Donald Lemons	3,842		
Conservative	Sid Cordle	2,144	32.0	−0.3
Conservative	G. Dyer	2,100		
Conservative	Maisie Hyatt	1,978		
Liberal	Donald Smith	457	6.8	−2.1
Communist	Neville Taylor	145	2.1	+0.2
Majority		1,698	27.0	+2.5
Turnout		6,694	42.8	
Labour hold		Swing		
Labour hold		Swing		
Labour hold		Swing	+1.2	

Hillsborough
Party	Candidate	Votes	%	±%
Labour	Alf Meade	3,879	53.3	+1.9
Labour	D. Morgan	3,666		
Labour	Gordon Mills	3,658		
Conservative	William Travis	3,400	46.7	−1.9
Conservative	A. Banham*	3,383		
Conservative	A. Slack	3,342		
Majority		258	6.6	+3.8
Turnout		7,279	48.5	
Labour gain from Conservative		Swing		
Labour gain from Conservative		Swing		
Labour gain from Conservative		Swing	+1.9	

Intake
Party	Candidate	Votes	%	±%
Labour	Joe Thomas*	3,853	59.8	−5.5
Labour	Mike Bower*	3,772		
Labour	Steve Jones	3,768		
Conservative	G. Bolton	2,076	32.2	−2.4
Conservative	P. Cavanagh	1,914		
Conservative	D. Clover	1,844		
Liberal	H. Wallace	510	7.9	+7.9
Liberal	A. Eggleston	440		
Majority		1,692	27.6	−3.1
Turnout		6,439	41.7	
Labour hold		Swing		
Labour hold		Swing		
Labour hold		Swing	-1.5	

Manor
Party	Candidate	Votes	%	±%
Labour	Dora Fitter*	3,194	76.1	+3.4
Labour	Colin Radcliffe*	3,076		
Labour	Gerald Bermingham	2,974		
Conservative	George Booth	595	14.2	−5.4
Conservative	Roger Barnsley	510		
Conservative	Pat Barnsley	467		
Liberal	Jacqueline Butler	260	6.2	+0.7
Liberal	Philip Taylor	213		
Communist	John Hukin	147	3.5	+1.4
Majority		2,379	61.9	+8.8
Turnout		4,196	30.4	
Labour hold		Swing		
Labour hold		Swing		
Labour hold		Swing	+4.4	

Mosborough
Party	Candidate	Votes	%	±%
Labour	Dorothy Walton*	3,626	71.9	+2.5
Labour	S. Dootson*	3,529		
Labour	Mary Anne Foulds*	3,493		
Conservative	G. Ranson	1,413	28.0	−2.6
Conservative	L. Napier	1,332		
Conservative	A. O'Donnell	1,315		
Majority		2,080	43.9	+5.1
Turnout		5,039	34.4	
Labour hold		Swing		
Labour hold		Swing		
Labour hold		Swing	+2.5	

Nether Edge
Party	Candidate	Votes	%	±%
Conservative	Connie Dodson*	3,231	53.7	+6.7
Conservative	Paul Verhaert*	3,171		
Conservative	Christine Smith*	3,152		
Labour	Albert Richardson*	2,175	36.2	+1.9
Labour	E. Sargent	2,100		
Labour	Marilyn Tsiorvas	2,079		
Liberal	K. Salt	605	10.0	−8.6
Liberal	I. Johnson	586		
Liberal	Patrick Smith	564		
Majority		977	17.5	+4.8
Turnout		6,011	42.3	
Conservative hold		Swing		
Conservative hold		Swing		
Conservative hold		Swing	+2.4	

Nether Shire
Party	Candidate	Votes	%	±%
Labour	Roger Barton*	3,465	77.1	+5.9
Labour	Philip Moscrop*	3,438		
Labour	Alan Wigfield*	3,364		
Conservative	D. Housley	896	19.9	−6.1
Conservative	Paul Mort	881		
Conservative	Edith Bush	877		
Communist	Paul Mackey	132	2.9	+0.1
Majority		2,468	57.2	+12.0
Turnout		4,493	35.3	
Labour hold		Swing		
Labour hold		Swing		
Labour hold		Swing	+6.0	

Netherthorpe
Party	Candidate	Votes	%	±%
Labour	Enid Hattersley*	3,274	70.8	+1.9
Labour	Harold Lambert*	3,265		
Labour	John Laurent	3,091		
Conservative	J. Elliss	1,179	25.5	−3.1
Conservative	Paul Makin	1,177		
Conservative	J. Dero	1,157		
S.D.P.	K. Bell	168	3.6	+3.6
Majority		1,912	45.3	+5.0
Turnout		4,621	35.0	
Labour hold		Swing		
Labour hold		Swing		
Labour hold		Swing	+2.5	

Norton
Party	Candidate	Votes	%	±%
Labour	H. Fidler*	3,720	61.6	+7.2
Labour	B. Glenn*	3,685		
Labour	Sam Wall*	3,472		
Conservative	L. Moir	1,823	30.2	−6.5
Conservative	Maureen Neill	1,803		
Conservative	J. Ormerod	1,761		
Liberal	Robert Mumford	497	8.2	−0.6
Majority		1,649	31.4	+13.7
Turnout		6,040	43.0	
Labour hold		Swing		
Labour hold		Swing		
Labour hold		Swing	+6.8	

Owlerton
Party	Candidate	Votes	%	±%
Labour	George Burrows	3,201	74.6	+0.9
Labour	Helen Jackson	3,017		
Labour	J. Coulby	2,997		
Conservative	Frank Brookes	1,001	23.3	−2.9
Conservative	Stuart Dawson	911		
Conservative	P. Stafford	882		
National Front	R. Crookes	88	2.0	+2.0
Majority		2,200	51.3	+3.8
Turnout		4,290	33.0	
Labour hold		Swing		
Labour hold		Swing		
Labour hold		Swing	+1.9	

Park
Party	Candidate	Votes	%	±%
Labour	Peter Jones*	3,752	84.2	+10.3
Labour	Phillip Grisdale*	3,678		
Labour	Doris Mulhearn*	3,559		
Conservative	Nicholas Hutton	578	13.0	−5.4
Conservative	Margaret Beatson	569		
Conservative	Ian Beatson	561		
Communist	R. Paulucy	125	2.8	+1.9
Majority		2,981	71.2	+15.7
Turnout		4,455	31.9	
Labour hold		Swing		
Labour hold		Swing		
Labour hold		Swing	+7.8	

Sharrow
Party	Candidate	Votes	%	±%
Labour	John Butler	2,630	64.6	+4.3
Labour	Howard Knight*	2,622		
Labour	Alf Wood*	2,599		
Conservative	W. Price	1,293	31.8	+4.0
Conservative	Thomas Seaton	1,238		
Conservative	T. Thompson	1,225		
Communist	Brian Turley	144	3.5	+1.5
Majority		1,306	32.8	+0.3
Turnout		4,067	31.2	
Labour hold		Swing		
Labour hold		Swing		
Labour hold		Swing	+0.1	

South Wortley
Party	Candidate	Votes	%	±%
Labour	H. Howard*	2,950	38.9	−0.3
Labour	F. Rodgers*	2,758		
Labour	Harry Hanwell	2,700		
Conservative	Sylvia Cowley*	2,651	35.0	−4.9
Conservative	D. Warren	2,635		
Conservative	E. Vawser	2,228		
Liberal	Philip Howson	1,974	26.0	+5.2
Liberal	P. Weston	1,851		
Liberal	M. Travis	1,774		
Majority		49	3.9	+3.2
Turnout		7,575	44.1	
Labour hold		Swing		
Labour hold		Swing		
Labour gain from Conservative		Swing	+2.6	

Southey Green
Party	Candidate	Votes	%	±%
Labour	David Blunkett*	3,606	87.7	+8.6
Labour	Sandra Davies*	3,276		
Labour	Dorothy Podlesny*	3,275		
Conservative	Derek Eastwood	503	12.2	−8.6
Conservative	Hedley Oldfield	472		
Conservative	Patricia Oldfield	444		
Majority		2,772	75.5	+17.2
Turnout		4,109	32.8	
Labour hold		Swing		
Labour hold		Swing		
Labour hold		Swing	+8.6	

Stocksbridge
Party	Candidate	Votes	%	±%
Liberal	A. Cooke*	3,286	52.2	−6.5
Liberal	M. Heraty	2,504		
Liberal	June Hibberd	2,434		
Labour	Anthony Sweeney*	1,540	24.5	+2.7
Conservative	N. Horton	1,464	23.3	+3.8
Conservative	Barrie Jones	1,334		
Conservative	R. Homer	1,303		
Labour	S. Donoghue	1,280		
Labour	E. Guest	1,222		
Majority		894	27.7	−9.2
Turnout		6,290	54.0	
Liberal hold		Swing		
Liberal gain from Labour		Swing		
Liberal gain from Labour		Swing	-4.6	

Walkley
Party	Candidate	Votes	%	±%
Labour	Alan Billings*	3,829	65.9	+4.5
Labour	William Owen*	3,752		
Labour	Paul Wood*	3,713		
Conservative	P. Booler	1,977	34.0	−4.5
Conservative	G. Parkin	1,937		
Conservative	M. Rogers	1,905		
Majority		1,736	31.9	−8.9
Turnout		5,806	42.8	
Labour hold		Swing		
Labour hold		Swing		
Labour hold		Swing	+4.5	
