= 1987 Sheffield City Council election =

← 1986	7 May 1987	1988 →

31 of 87 seats to Sheffield City Council 44 seats needed for a majority
	First party	Second party	Third party
Party	Labour	Conservative	Alliance
Seats won	23	5	3
Seat change	▲2	▼2	0
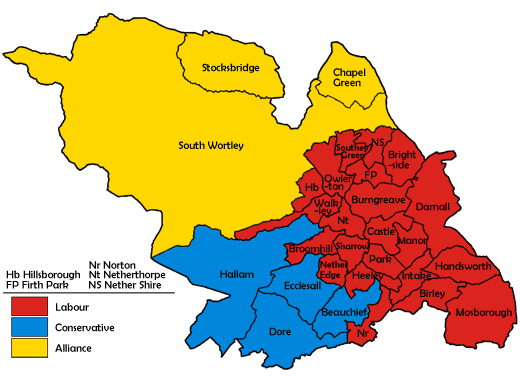
- Map showing the results of the 1987 Sheffield City Council elections.
Majority party before election
Labour Party (UK)
Majority party after election
Labour Party (UK)

Elections to Sheffield City Council were held on 7 May 1987. One third of the council was up for election.

== Election result ==
Sheffield local election result 1987
Party	Seats	Gains	Losses	Net gain/loss	Seats %	Votes %	Votes	+/−
Labour	23	2	0	+2	74.2	51.1	87,584	-2.6
Alliance	3	0	0	0	9.7	27.7	47,444	+2.4
Conservative	5	0	2	-2	16.1	21.0	35,927	+1.0
Green	0	0	0	0	0.0	0.1	239	-0.1
Communist	0	0	0	0	0.0	0.1	90	+0.1

This result had the following consequences for the total number of seats on the Council after the elections:

Party	Previous council	New council
Labour	63	65
Conservatives	15	13
SDP–Liberal Alliance	9	9
Total	87	87
Working majority	39	43

== Ward results ==
Beauchief
Party	Candidate	Votes	%	±%
Conservative	Clifford Godber*	2,972	36.7	−2.9
Alliance	Peter Moore	2,665	32.9	+9.8
Labour	Roy Munn	2,467	30.4	−6.8
Majority		307	3.8	+1.4
Turnout		8,104	53.1	+12.5
Conservative hold		Swing	-6.3	

Birley
Party	Candidate	Votes	%	±%
Labour	Joan Ramsbottom	3,790	59.8	−5.7
Alliance	Cyril Skipworth	1,409	22.2	+1.4
Conservative	Shirley Clayton	1,139	18.0	+4.4
Majority		2,381	37.6	−7.1
Turnout		6,338	39.2	+5.2
Labour hold		Swing	-3.5	

Brightside
Party	Candidate	Votes	%	±%
Labour	Patrick Heath*	2,912	71.1	−4.9
Alliance	Francis Pierce	702	17.1	+1.5
Conservative	Simon Briggs	479	11.7	+3.3
Majority		2,210	54.0	−6.4
Turnout		4,093	31.7	+2.2
Labour hold		Swing	-3.2	

Broomhill
Party	Candidate	Votes	%	±%
Labour	Jacqueline Mosley	2,295	38.3	−1.5
Alliance	Jane Padget	1,868	31.2	−0.4
Conservative	Richard Foster	1,825	30.5	+1.9
Majority		427	7.1	−1.1
Turnout		5,988	45.6	+3.8
Labour gain from Conservative		Swing	-0.5	

Burngreave
Party	Candidate	Votes	%	±%
Labour	James Jamison*	3,009	66.5	−13.1
Alliance	Sheila Rehman	971	21.5	+1.1
Conservative	Isobel Watson	542	12.0	+12.0
Majority		2,038	45.0	−14.2
Turnout		4,522	36.5	+4.0
Labour hold		Swing	-7.1	

Castle
Party	Candidate	Votes	%	±%
Labour	David Skinner*	3,061	77.5	−6.4
Alliance	Peter Horsfield	463	11.7	+1.8
Conservative	Joan Graham	424	10.7	+4.5
Majority		2,598	65.8	−8.2
Turnout		3,948	30.9	+1.8
Labour hold		Swing	-4.1	

Chapel Green
Party	Candidate	Votes	%	±%
Alliance	Geoffrey Griffiths*	4,508	54.2	+6.4
Labour	Peter Duff	3,245	39.0	−6.7
Conservative	Kathryn Robinson	559	6.7	+0.3
Majority		1,263	15.2	+13.1
Turnout		8,312	46.9	+8.0
Alliance hold		Swing	+6.5	

Darnall
Party	Candidate	Votes	%	±%
Labour	Roy Hattersley	3,278	63.3	+21.2
Alliance	Dennis Boothroyd	1,056	20.4	−6.6
Conservative	Colin Cavill	844	16.3	+1.1
Majority		2,222	42.9	+27.8
Turnout		5,178	35.1	+4.0
Labour hold		Swing	+13.9	

Dore
Party	Candidate	Votes	%	±%
Conservative	Patricia Davey*	4,114	51.5	+2.1
Labour	Edward Lamb	2,053	25.7	−2.3
Alliance	Janice Sidebottom	1,820	22.8	+0.2
Majority		2,061	25.8	+4.4
Turnout		7,987	48.0	+7.9
Conservative hold		Swing	+2.2	

Ecclesall
Party	Candidate	Votes	%	±%
Conservative	Richard Old	4,019	52.0	+4.3
Alliance	Christine Freeman	2,212	28.6	−3.4
Labour	Roy Darke	1,497	19.4	−0.9
Majority		1,807	23.4	+7.7
Turnout		7,728	48.9	+6.6
Conservative hold		Swing	+3.8	

Firth Park
Party	Candidate	Votes	%	±%
Labour	Howard Knight**	3,601	74.8	−5.8
Alliance	Glyn Evans	1,215	25.2	+25.2
Majority		1,486	49.6	−19.0
Turnout		4,816	35.7	+4.9
Labour hold		Swing	-15.5	

Howard Knight was a sitting councillor for Sharrow ward

Hallam
Party	Candidate	Votes	%	±%
Conservative	Angela Knight	3,810	49.5	+9.0
Conservative	Nicholas Aslam	3,799		
Alliance	John Knight	2,388	31.0	−3.9
Alliance	Andrew Milton	2,308		
Labour	Kevin Mahoney	1,495	19.4	−5.1
Labour	James Prosser	1,341		
Majority		1,411	18.5	+12.9
Turnout		7,693	44.8	−4.1
Conservative hold		Swing		
Conservative hold		Swing	+6.4	

Handsworth
Party	Candidate	Votes	%	±%
Labour	Elsie Smith*	3,462	51.6	−17.6
Alliance	Alice Smith	2,602	38.8	+23.3
Conservative	Marjorie Kirby	620	9.2	−4.4
Green	Roger Dunn	23	0.3	−1.3
Majority		860	12.8	−40.9
Turnout		6,707	44.2	+10.0
Labour hold		Swing	-20.4	

Heeley
Party	Candidate	Votes	%	±%
Labour	John Crowder	3,359	57.9	−0.7
Alliance	Douglas Oldfield	1,220	21.0	+1.1
Conservative	John Webster	1,217	21.0	+0.5
Majority		2,139	36.9	−1.2
Turnout		5,796	38.8	+3.8
Labour hold		Swing	-0.9	

Hillsborough
Party	Candidate	Votes	%	±%
Labour	John Buckley	3,334	46.8	−3.4
Alliance	Francis Butler	2,370	33.3	+2.3
Conservative	Michael Warner	1,413	19.8	+1.0
Majority		964	13.5	−5.7
Turnout		7,117	46.9	+4.4
Labour hold		Swing	-2.8	

Intake
Party	Candidate	Votes	%	±%
Labour	Michael Bower*	3,499	59.0	−2.2
Conservative	Elizabeth Bradbury	1,253	21.1	−1.0
Alliance	Sheila Hughes	1,178	19.8	+3.2
Majority		2,246	37.9	−1.2
Turnout		5,930	37.5	+4.6
Labour hold		Swing	-0.6	

Manor
Party	Candidate	Votes	%	±%
Labour	Paul Colk*	2,921	79.2	+79.2
Alliance	Pamela Brown	429	11.6	N/A
Conservative	Robert Usher	338	9.1	N/A
Majority		2,492	67.6	N/A
Turnout		3,688		N/A
Labour hold		Swing	N/A	

Mosborough
Party	Candidate	Votes	%	±%
Labour	Norman Sellars	4,425	59.3	−5.8
Conservative	Gordon Millward	1,602	21.5	+3.8
Alliance	Louise Truman	1,430	19.2	+2.0
Majority		2,823	37.8	−9.6
Turnout		7,457	35.6	+6.7
Labour hold		Swing	-4.8	

Nether Edge
Party	Candidate	Votes	%	±%
Labour	Patricia Midgley	2,508	38.5	−0.6
Alliance	George Manley	1,919	29.4	+2.7
Conservative	Paul Verhaert*	1,873	28.7	−1.7
Green	Jane Beharrell	216	3.3	−0.4
Majority		589	9.1	+0.4
Turnout		6,516	46.3	+2.4
Labour gain from Conservative		Swing	-1.6	

Nether Shire
Party	Candidate	Votes	%	±%
Labour	Stephen Jones*	3,350	72.6	−5.8
Alliance	George Clayton	1,266	27.4	+14.1
Majority		2,084	45.2	−19.9
Turnout		4,616	35.3	+2.1
Labour hold		Swing	-9.9	

Netherthorpe
Party	Candidate	Votes	%	±%
Labour	Christopher Walker	3,372	69.3	−4.3
Alliance	Peter McNutt	768	15.8	−10.6
Conservative	Henry Cornford	723	14.8	+14.8
Majority		2,604	53.5	+6.3
Turnout		4,863	38.3	+6.0
Labour hold		Swing	+3.1	

Norton
Party	Candidate	Votes	%	±%
Labour	Frank White**	3,617	59.4	−4.3
Conservative	Albert Marsden	1,371	22.5	+4.4
Alliance	Ian Auckland	1,104	18.1	+0.0
Majority		2,246	36.9	−8.7
Turnout		6,092	44.9	+5.8
Labour hold		Swing	-4.3	

Frank White was a sitting councillor for Birley ward

Owlerton
Party	Candidate	Votes	%	±%
Labour	Helen Jackson*	3,251	68.6	−5.4
Alliance	John Brocklebank	883	18.6	+3.8
Conservative	Lorna Banham	602	12.7	+1.6
Majority		2,368	50.0	−9.2
Turnout		4,736	36.2	+6.3
Labour hold		Swing	-4.6	

Park
Party	Candidate	Votes	%	±%
Labour	Vivienne Nicholson*	3,449	78.5	−4.3
Alliance	Donald Smith	492	11.2	+1.7
Conservative	Jeremy Richardson**	454	10.3	+2.6
Majority		2,957	67.3	−6.0
Turnout		4,395	31.2	+6.5
Labour hold		Swing	-3.0	

Jeremy Richardson was a sitting councillor for Ecclesall ward

Sharrow
Party	Candidate	Votes	%	±%
Labour	Doris Askham	2,619	63.3	−1.4
Conservative	Anne Smith	780	18.8	+3.5
Alliance	Muhammad Zahur	649	15.7	−1.5
Communist	Brian Turley	90	2.2	+0.5
Majority		1,839	44.5	−3.0
Turnout		4,138	33.9	+2.7
Labour hold		Swing	-2.4	

South Wortley
Party	Candidate	Votes	%	±%
Alliance	David Baker*	4,191	48.7	+1.0
Labour	Eldon Hanson	2,667	31.0	−5.1
Conservative	Lynn Wilson	1,738	20.2	+4.0
Majority		524	17.7	+6.1
Turnout		8,596	46.9	+5.2
Alliance hold		Swing	+3.0	

Southey Green
Party	Candidate	Votes	%	±%
Labour	Anthony Damms	3,632	81.3	+81.3
Alliance	Raymond Mellor	834	18.7	N/A
Majority		2,798	62.6	N/A
Turnout		4,466	35.9	N/A
Labour hold		Swing	N/A	

Stocksbridge
Party	Candidate	Votes	%	±%
Alliance	Malcolm Johnson*	2,590	53.0	+5.4
Labour	Judith Chandler	1,751	35.9	−5.9
Conservative	Beryl Fleming	540	11.0	+0.5
Majority		839	17.1	+11.3
Turnout		4,881	46.3	+8.1
Alliance hold		Swing	+5.6	

Walkley
Party	Candidate	Votes	%	±%
Labour	Bill Owen*	3,665	55.7	+1.8
Labour	Jean Cromar	3,474		
Alliance	David Brown**	2,242	34.0	−3.7
Alliance	Margaret Ritchie	2,002		
Conservative	Giles Orton	676	10.2	+1.9
Conservative	Christine Smith	635		
Majority		1,232	21.7	+5.5
Turnout		6,583	43.7	+0.8
Labour hold		Swing		
Labour hold		Swing	+2.7	

David Brown was a sitting councillor for Darnall ward, and was previously elected as a Labour councillor
