= 1979 Sheffield City Council election =

← 1978	3 May 1979	1980 →

33 of 90 seats to Sheffield City Council 46 seats needed for a majority
	First party	Second party	Third party
Party	Labour	Conservative	Liberal
Seats won	22	9	2
Seat change	▲2	▼2	0
Majority party before election
Labour Party (UK)
Majority party after election
Labour Party (UK)

Elections to Sheffield City Council were held on 3 May 1979. One third of the council was up for election.

== Election result ==
Sheffield local election result 1979
Party	Seats	Gains	Losses	Net gain/loss	Seats %	Votes %	Votes	+/−
Labour	22	3	1	+2	66.6	52.8	156,228	+2.6
Conservative	9	0	2	-2	27.3	35.3	104,364	-5.6
Liberal	2	1	1	0	6.0	11.4	33,707	+3.4
Communist	0	0	0	0	0.0	0.4	1,195	+0.1
Independent	0	0	0	0	0.0	0.1	389	-0.4

This result has the following consequences for the total number of seats on the Council after the elections:

Party	Previous council	New council
Labour	60	62
Conservatives	24	22
Liberal	6	6
Communist	0	0
Independent	0	0
Total	90	90
Working majority	30	34

== Ward results ==
Attercliffe
Party	Candidate	Votes	%	±%
Labour	Jim Pearson*	2,572	73.2	−5.5
Conservative	Jonathan Freeman	575	16.3	−4.9
Liberal	David Johnson	366	10.4	+10.4
Majority		1,997	56.9	−0.6
Turnout		3,513		
Labour hold		Swing	-0.3	

Beauchief
Party	Candidate	Votes	%	±%
Conservative	Cliff Godber*	8,718	69.3	−6.5
Labour	D. Lyons	3,867	30.7	+6.6
Majority		4,851	38.6	−13.1
Turnout		12,585		
Conservative hold		Swing	-6.5	

Birley
Party	Candidate	Votes	%	±%
Labour	George Fisher*	7,392	61.2	−0.0
Conservative	G. Slater	3,442	28.5	−10.2
Liberal	P. Pridmore	846	7.0	+7.0
Independent	E. Evison	389	3.2	+3.2
Majority		3,950	32.7	+10.2
Turnout		12,069		
Labour hold		Swing	+5.1	

Brightside
Party	Candidate	Votes	%	±%
Labour	Peter Price*	5,727	67.2	−1.9
Conservative	C. Jackson	1,899	22.3	−8.5
Liberal	J. Maling	898	10.5	+10.5
Majority		3,828	44.9	+6.6
Turnout		8,524		
Labour hold		Swing	+3.3	

Broomhill
Party	Candidate	Votes	%	±%
Conservative	Marvyn Moore*	5,237	48.9	−10.2
Labour	J. Kinderlerer	3,343	31.2	+2.7
Liberal	Martin Hayes-Allen	2,133	19.9	+7.6
Majority		3,343	17.7	−12.9
Turnout		10,713		
Conservative hold		Swing	-6.4	

Burngreave
Party	Candidate	Votes	%	±%
Labour	F. Woodbine	3,129	44.3	+15.1
Liberal	Roger Wilson	2,825	40.0	−23.7
Conservative	Don Sparkes*	1,006	14.2	+7.9
Communist	E. Walker	99	1.4	+0.6
Majority		304	4.3	−30.2
Turnout		7,059		
Labour gain from Liberal		Swing	+19.4	

Don Sparkes was previously elected as a Liberal councillor

Castle
Party	Candidate	Votes	%	±%
Labour	Roy Munn*	4,976	74.9	−2.8
Conservative	Maisie Hyatt	1,118	16.8	−4.0
Liberal	Christopher Fenn	461	6.9	+6.9
Communist	M. Heywood	88	1.3	−0.2
Majority		3,858	58.1	+1.2
Turnout		6,643		
Labour hold		Swing	+0.6	

Chapel Green
Party	Candidate	Votes	%	±%
Liberal	G. Tricket	6,484	52.7	−5.6
Labour	B. Kanwar	3,504	28.5	−2.8
Conservative	M. Shelley	2,318	18.8	+8.5
Majority		2,980	24.2	−2.8
Turnout		12,306		
Liberal hold		Swing	-1.4	

Darnall
Party	Candidate	Votes	%	±%
Labour	Isidore Lewis*	4,878	59.9	+0.4
Conservative	Shirley Rhodes	2,296	28.2	−4.9
Liberal	Dennis Boothroyd	962	11.8	+4.4
Majority		2,582	31.7	
Turnout		8,136		
Labour hold		Swing	+2.6	

Dore
Party	Candidate	Votes	%	±%
Conservative	Pat Santhouse*	8,378	67.0	−6.2
Labour	G. Hammersley	4,122	33.0	+6.3
Majority		4,256	34.0	−12.5
Turnout		12,500		
Conservative hold		Swing	-6.2	

Ecclesall
Party	Candidate	Votes	%	±%
Conservative	William Dunsmore*	7,157	61.0	−7.6
Liberal	P. Cruickshank	2,611	22.2	+9.4
Labour	R. Kapadia	1,957	16.7	−1.9
Majority		4,546	38.8	−11.2
Turnout		11,725		
Conservative hold		Swing	-8.5	

Firth Park
Party	Candidate	Votes	%	±%
Labour	Terry Butler*	7,249	67.5	+1.1
Conservative	M. McGrath	2,251	20.9	−0.6
Liberal	P. Miernik	1,241	11.5	−0.5
Majority		4,998	46.6	+1.7
Turnout		10,741		
Labour hold		Swing	+0.8	

Gleadless
Party	Candidate	Votes	%	±%
Labour	Joan Brown	7,543	54.4	
Conservative	W. Bush	5,088	36.7	
Liberal	Robert Mumford	1,220	8.8	
Majority		2,355	17.7	
Turnout		13,851		
Labour hold		Swing		

Hallam
Party	Candidate	Votes	%	±%
Conservative	R. Hobson	6,994	56.7	−14.2
Labour	Dennis Brown	3,756	30.4	+1.4
Liberal	Jean Mason	1,586	12.8	+12.8
Majority		3,238	26.3	−15.6
Turnout		12,336		
Conservative hold		Swing	-7.8	

Handsworth
Party	Candidate	Votes	%	±%
Labour	Annie Britton*	7,413	67.2	+7.0
Conservative	Dorothy Kennedy	3,608	32.7	−1.0
Majority		3,805	34.5	+8.0
Turnout		11,021		
Labour hold		Swing	+4.0	

Heeley
Party	Candidate	Votes	%	±%
Labour	John Senior*	5,549	56.8	+5.9
Conservative	Sid Cordle	3,154	32.3	−9.5
Liberal	P. Clements	872	8.9	+3.7
Communist	Neville Taylor	186	1.9	−0.0
Majority		2,395	24.5	+15.4
Turnout		9,761		
Labour hold		Swing	+7.7	

Hillsborough
Party	Candidate	Votes	%	±%
Labour	R. Glenn	5,723	51.4	+4.2
Conservative	Sween Batiste	5,411	48.6	−4.2
Conservative	M. Edeson	5,392		
Labour	Lawrence Kingham	5,383		
Majority		19	2.8	−2.8
Turnout		11,134		
Labour gain from Conservative		Swing	+4.2	
Conservative hold		Swing		

Intake
Party	Candidate	Votes	%	±%
Labour	Joe Thomas*	7,553	65.3	+6.9
Conservative	G. Bolton	4,005	34.6	−3.0
Majority		3,548	30.7	+9.9
Turnout		11,558		
Labour hold		Swing	+4.9	

Manor
Party	Candidate	Votes	%	±%
Labour	Colin Radcliffe*	6,437	72.7	−3.6
Conservative	George Booth	1,735	19.6	−1.2
Liberal	Jacqueline Butler	488	5.5	+5.5
Communist	John Hukin	192	2.1	+0.1
Majority		4,702	53.1	−2.4
Turnout		8,852		
Labour hold		Swing	-1.2	

Mosborough
Party	Candidate	Votes	%	±%
Labour	S. Dootson	7,372	69.4	−1.3
Conservative	A. Calow	3,249	30.6	+1.4
Majority		4,123	38.8	−2.7
Turnout		10,621		
Labour hold		Swing	-1.3	

Nether Edge
Party	Candidate	Votes	%	±%
Conservative	Connie Dodson*	4,376	47.0	−9.4
Conservative	Christine Smith	4,022		
Labour	Harry Hanwell**	3,197	34.3	+1.8
Labour	John Laurent	3,036		
Liberal	K. Salt	1,736	18.6	+7.6
Liberal	Patrick Smith	1,297		
Majority		825	12.7	−11.2
Turnout		9,309		
Conservative hold		Swing		
Conservative hold		Swing	-5.6	

Harry Hanwell was a sitting councillor for Owlerton ward

Nether Shire
Party	Candidate	Votes	%	±%
Labour	Philip Moscrop*	6,212	71.2	+5.0
Conservative	L. Smith	2,271	26.0	−5.5
Communist	Kenneth Hattersley	242	2.8	+0.5
Majority		3,941	45.2	+10.5
Turnout		8,725		
Labour hold		Swing	+5.2	

Netherthorpe
Party	Candidate	Votes	%	±%
Labour	Enid Hattersley*	4,820	68.9	+1.1
Conservative	P. Wilkinson	1,999	28.6	−1.7
Communist	J. Hudson	174	2.5	+2.5
Majority		2,821	40.3	+2.8
Turnout		6,993		
Labour hold		Swing	+1.4	

Owlerton
Party	Candidate	Votes	%	±%
Labour	H. Fidler	7,116	73.7	+2.0
Conservative	P. Stafford	2,533	26.2	−2.0
Majority		4,583	47.5	+4.0
Turnout		9,649		
Labour hold		Swing	+2.0	

Park
Party	Candidate	Votes	%	±%
Labour	Phillip Grisdale*	8,177	73.9	−4.0
Conservative	Nicholas Hutton	2,034	18.4	−2.4
Liberal	L. Miernik	755	6.8	+6.8
Communist	R. Paulucy	98	0.9	−0.4
Majority		6,143	55.5	−1.6
Turnout		11,064		
Labour hold		Swing	-0.8	

Sharrow
Party	Candidate	Votes	%	±%
Labour	Alf Wood*	3,519	60.3	−5.4
Conservative	Ian Saunders	1,625	27.8	−4.5
Liberal	I. Johnson	571	9.8	+9.8
Communist	Brian Turley	116	2.0	+0.1
Majority		1,894	32.5	−0.9
Turnout		5,831		
Labour hold		Swing	-0.4	

South Wortley
Party	Candidate	Votes	%	±%
Conservative	Sylvia Cowley	5,400	39.9	−16.8
Labour	H. Howard	5,300	39.2	−4.0
Labour	M. Rudd	4,935		
Conservative	E. Monton	4,931		
Liberal	Philip Howson	2,814	20.8	+20.8
Majority		365	0.7	−12.8
Turnout		13,514		
Conservative hold		Swing		
Labour gain from Conservative		Swing	+6.4	

Southey Green
Party	Candidate	Votes	%	±%
Labour	Dorothy Podlesny*	7,306	79.1	−0.9
Conservative	M. Toy	1,925	20.8	+0.8
Majority		5,381	58.3	−1.7
Turnout		9,231		
Labour hold		Swing	-0.8	

Stocksbridge
Party	Candidate	Votes	%	±%
Liberal	A. Cooke	4,838	58.7	+40.4
Labour	Alf Meade	1,801	21.8	−14.1
Conservative	Barrie Jones	1,606	19.5	−8.9
Majority		3,037	36.9	+29.4
Turnout		8,245		
Liberal gain from Labour		Swing	+27.2	

Walkley
Party	Candidate	Votes	%	±%
Labour	William Owen*	4,718	61.5	+2.5
Conservative	Mary Harrison	2,956	38.5	−2.4
Majority		1,762	23.0	+4.9
Turnout		7,674		
Labour hold		Swing	+2.4	
