= 1984 Sheffield City Council election =

← 1983	3 May 1984	1986 →

31 of 87 seats to Sheffield City Council 44 seats needed for a majority
	First party	Second party	Third party
Party	Labour	Conservative	Alliance
Seats won	22	5	4
Seat change	Steady	▼1	▲1
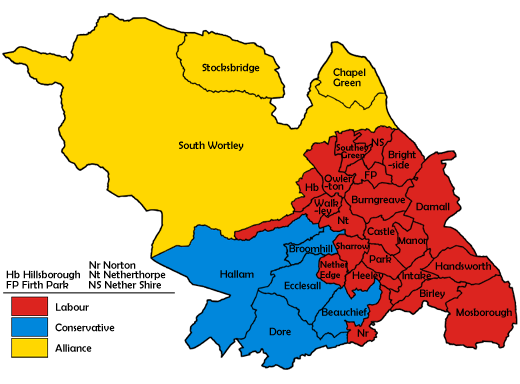
- Map showing the results of the 1984 Sheffield City Council elections.
Majority party before election
Labour Party (UK)
Majority party after election
Labour Party (UK)

Elections to Sheffield City Council were held on 3 May 1984. One third of the council was up for election.

== Election result ==
Sheffield local election result 1984
Party	Seats	Gains	Losses	Net gain/loss	Seats %	Votes %	Votes	+/−
Labour	22	2	2	0	70.9	54.6	82,184	+3.7
Conservative	5	0	1	-1	16.1	24.6	37,012	-4.6
Alliance	4	2	1	+1	12.9	20.5	30,924	+0.8
Communist	0	0	0	0	0.0	0.2	258	+0.1
Ecology	0	0	0	0	0.0	0.1	107	N/A

This result had the following consequences for the total number of seats on the Council after the elections:

Party	Previous council	New council
Labour	60	61
Conservatives	18	17
SDP–Liberal Alliance	9	9
Total	87	87
Working majority	33	35

== Ward results ==
Beauchief
Party	Candidate	Votes	%	±%
Conservative	Danny George*	3,074	54.3	+1.1
Labour	Mohammed Walayat	1,483	26.2	−2.3
Alliance (SDP)	N. Knox	1,098	19.4	+1.1
Majority		1,591	28.1	+3.4
Turnout		5,655		
Conservative hold		Swing	+1.7	

Birley
Party	Candidate	Votes	%	±%
Labour	Val Shepherd	3,755	63.9	+4.2
Conservative	Christopher Goldsmith	1,284	21.9	−3.8
Alliance (SDP)	Cyril Skipworth	832	14.2	−0.4
Majority		2,471	42.0	+8.0
Turnout		5,871		
Labour hold		Swing	+4.0	

Brightside
Party	Candidate	Votes	%	±%
Labour	Peter Price*	2,757	70.3	+2.6
Labour	Patrick Heath	2,445		
Alliance (SDP)	George Wilson	724	18.4	+0.8
Conservative	V. McQuaid	442	11.2	−3.4
Conservative	Maisie Hyatt	409		
Majority		1,721	51.9	+1.8
Turnout		3,923		
Labour hold		Swing		
Labour hold		Swing	+0.9	

Broomhill
Party	Candidate	Votes	%	±%
Conservative	Irvine Patnick*	1,929	43.4	−4.8
Labour	Jacqueline Mosley	1,586	35.7	+5.7
Alliance (SDP)	Patrick Smith	928	20.9	−0.8
Majority		343	7.7	−10.5
Turnout		4,443		
Conservative hold		Swing	-5.2	

Burngreave
Party	Candidate	Votes	%	±%
Labour	James Boyce	3,482	53.2	+0.6
Alliance (Liberal)	Francis Butler*	2,736	41.8	+0.7
Conservative	Evelyn Millward	294	4.5	−1.3
Communist	Paul Mackey	26	0.4	−0.1
Majority		746	11.4	−0.1
Turnout		6,538		
Labour gain from Alliance		Swing	-0.0	

Castle
Party	Candidate	Votes	%	±%
Labour	Reg Munn*	2,995	77.9	+1.1
Conservative	Joan Graham	494	12.8	−1.1
Alliance (SDP)	Patricia Major	314	8.2	−0.2
Communist	Violet Gill	40	1.0	+0.1
Majority		2,501	65.1	+2.2
Turnout		3,843		
Labour hold		Swing	+1.1	

Chapel Green
Party	Candidate	Votes	%	±%
Alliance (Liberal)	David Chadwick*	3,517	56.1	+3.3
Labour	Henry Hanwell	2,302	36.7	+0.1
Conservative	J. Edwards	447	7.1	−3.4
Majority		1,215	19.4	+3.2
Turnout		6,266		
Alliance hold		Swing	+1.6	

Darnall
Party	Candidate	Votes	%	±%
Labour	Frank Prince*	2,934	65.2	+4.0
Conservative	Colin Cavill	944	21.0	−2.1
Alliance (Liberal)	Dennis Boothroyd	622	13.8	−1.8
Majority		1,990	44.2	+6.1
Turnout		4,500		
Labour hold		Swing	+3.0	

Dore
Party	Candidate	Votes	%	±%
Conservative	David Heslop*	3,856	58.4	−0.7
Labour	Chris Prescott	1,680	25.4	+1.6
Alliance (SDP)	W. Lawrie	1,060	16.1	−1.0
Majority		2,176	33.0	−2.3
Turnout		6,596		
Conservative hold		Swing	-1.1	

Ecclesall
Party	Candidate	Votes	%	±%
Conservative	Sidney Cordle	3,542	56.3	−4.1
Alliance (Liberal)	Arthur Fawthrop	1,537	24.4	+0.4
Labour	N. Eaton	1,212	19.2	+3.6
Majority		2,005	31.9	−4.5
Turnout		6,291		
Conservative hold		Swing	-2.2	

Firth Park
Party	Candidate	Votes	%	±%
Labour	Clive Betts*	3,571	77.2	+4.6
Alliance (Liberal)	D. Wagland	551	11.9	−3.3
Conservative	Lorna Banham	501	10.8	−1.4
Majority		3,020	65.3	+7.9
Turnout		4,623		
Labour hold		Swing	+3.9	

Hallam
Party	Candidate	Votes	%	±%
Conservative	Peter Jackson*	3,417	54.9	−4.5
Alliance (Liberal)	G. Hughes	1,526	24.5	+0.6
Labour	J. Hesketh	1,280	20.5	+3.9
Majority		1,891	30.4	−5.1
Turnout		6,223		
Conservative hold		Swing	-2.5	

Handsworth
Party	Candidate	Votes	%	±%
Labour	George Nicholls*	3,141	65.9	+4.4
Conservative	Dorothy Kennedy	993	20.8	−2.7
Alliance (SDP)	Jane Padget	632	13.2	−1.8
Majority		2,148	45.1	+7.1
Turnout		4,766		
Labour hold		Swing	+3.5	

Heeley
Party	Candidate	Votes	%	±%
Labour	Phyllis Smith	3,279	61.0	+5.0
Conservative	Elizabeth Bradbury	1,422	26.4	−4.2
Alliance (SDP)	Raymond Mellor	674	12.5	−0.8
Majority		1,857	34.6	+9.2
Turnout		5,375		
Labour hold		Swing	+4.6	

Hillsborough
Party	Candidate	Votes	%	±%
Labour	Alf Meade*	3,484	51.8	+6.1
Alliance (Liberal)	Penelope Smith	1,660	24.6	+5.4
Conservative	Peter Smith	1,585	23.5	−11.6
Majority		1,824	27.2	+16.6
Turnout		6,729		
Labour hold		Swing	+0.3	

Intake
Party	Candidate	Votes	%	±%
Labour	Philip Moscrop	3,087	59.0	+1.4
Conservative	Giles Orton	1,388	26.5	−0.9
Alliance (SDP)	J. Wild	759	14.5	−0.4
Majority		1,699	32.5	+2.3
Turnout		5,234		
Labour hold		Swing	+1.1	

Manor
Party	Candidate	Votes	%	±%
Labour	William Jordan	3,088	82.0	+2.6
Conservative	George Booth	402	10.7	−0.9
Alliance (SDP)	Pamela Brown	276	7.3	−1.1
Majority		2,686	71.3	+3.5
Turnout		3,766		
Labour hold		Swing	+1.7	

Mosborough
Party	Candidate	Votes	%	±%
Labour	Dorothy Walton*	4,144	67.0	+9.5
Conservative	G. Ranson	1,339	21.6	−5.9
Alliance (SDP)	Hilary Gooch	697	11.3	−3.7
Majority		2,805	45.4	+15.4
Turnout		6,180		
Labour hold		Swing	+7.7	

Nether Edge
Party	Candidate	Votes	%	±%
Labour	Janet Fiore	2,509	43.1	+4.4
Conservative	Ian Fey	2,304	39.6	−5.3
Alliance (Liberal)	Paul Metcalfe	893	15.3	−1.0
Ecology	Jane Beharrell	107	1.8	+1.8
Majority		205	3.5	−2.7
Turnout		5,813		
Labour gain from Conservative		Swing	+4.8	

Nether Shire
Party	Candidate	Votes	%	±%
Labour	Roger Barton*	3,252	70.6	+2.3
Alliance (SDP)	Robert Shillito	838	18.2	+1.5
Conservative	A. Banham	512	11.1	−3.8
Majority		2,414	52.4	+0.8
Turnout		4,602		
Labour hold		Swing	+0.4	

Netherthorpe
Party	Candidate	Votes	%	±%
Labour	A. Robinson	3,128	74.8	+8.0
Conservative	Simon Briggs	960	22.9	+2.1
Communist	Gordon Ashberry	94	2.2	+1.0
Majority		2,168	51.9	+5.9
Turnout		4,182		
Labour hold		Swing	+2.9	

Norton
Party	Candidate	Votes	%	±%
Labour	John Butler**	3,479	62.8	+3.3
Conservative	B. Farnsworth	1,368	24.7	−4.5
Alliance (Liberal)	H. Wallace	688	12.4	+1.2
Majority		2,111	38.1	+7.8
Turnout		5,535		
Labour hold		Swing	+3.9	

John Butler was a sitting councillor for Sharrow ward

Owlerton
Party	Candidate	Votes	%	±%
Labour	George Burrows*	3,038	74.7	+6.1
Conservative	Ian Beatson	552	13.6	−5.4
Alliance (Liberal)	Philip Taylor	477	11.7	−0.6
Majority		2,486	61.1	+11.5
Turnout		4,067		
Labour hold		Swing	+5.7	

Park
Party	Candidate	Votes	%	±%
Labour	Peter Jones*	3,224	83.0	−0.3
Conservative	Shirley Rhodes	414	10.6	−6.0
Alliance (Liberal)	D. Eddy	244	6.3	+6.3
Majority		2,810	72.4	+5.7
Turnout		3,882		
Labour hold		Swing	+2.8	

Sharrow
Party	Candidate	Votes	%	±%
Labour	Mike Pye	2,304	69.0	+5.7
Alliance (Liberal)	R. Harrison	937	28.0	+15.7
Communist	M. Heywood	98	2.9	+1.3
Majority		1,367	41.0	+0.4
Turnout		3,339		
Labour hold		Swing	-5.0	

South Wortley
Party	Candidate	Votes	%	±%
Alliance (Liberal)	Alan Memmott	2,951	39.6	+1.1
Labour	H. Howard*	2,606	35.0	+4.4
Conservative	Sylvia Cowley	1,892	25.4	−5.4
Majority		345	4.6	−3.1
Turnout		7,449		
Alliance gain from Labour		Swing	-1.6	

Southey Green
Party	Candidate	Votes	%	±%
Labour	David Blunkett*	3,865	85.4	+3.8
Alliance (SDP)	E. Peacock	336	7.4	−1.9
Conservative	Elizabeth Hutton	323	7.1	−1.9
Majority		3,529	78.0	+5.7
Turnout		4,524		
Labour hold		Swing	+2.8	

Stocksbridge
Party	Candidate	Votes	%	±%
Alliance (Liberal)	June Hibberd	2,081	48.3	
Alliance (Liberal)	Malcolm Johnson	1,977		
Labour	John Johnston	1,801	41.8	
Labour	S. Thickett	1,786		
Conservative	William Travis	421	9.8	
Conservative	C. Whittaker	414		
Majority		176	6.5	
Turnout		4,303		
Alliance hold		Swing		
Alliance gain from Labour		Swing		

Walkley
Party	Candidate	Votes	%	±%
Labour	Alan Billings*	3,718	62.3	+5.2
Alliance (SDP)	David Brown	1,336	22.4	+3.3
Conservative	Radcliffe Wilson-Wolfe	913	15.3	−8.4
Majority		2,382	39.9	+6.5
Turnout		5,967		
Labour hold		Swing	+0.9	
