= 1988 Sheffield City Council election =

← 1987	5 May 1988	1990 →

30 of 87 seats to Sheffield City Council 44 seats needed for a majority
	First party	Second party	Third party
Party	Labour	Conservative	SLD
Seats won	23	4	3
Seat change	▲1	▼1	0
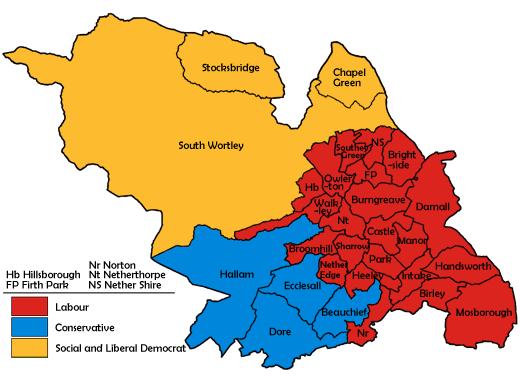
- Map showing the results of the 1988 Sheffield City Council elections.
Majority party before election
Labour Party (UK)
Majority party after election
Labour Party (UK)

Elections to Sheffield City Council were held on 5 May 1988. One third of the council was up for election.

== Election result ==
Sheffield local election result 1988
Party	Seats	Gains	Losses	Net gain/loss	Seats %	Votes %	Votes	+/−
Labour	23	1	0	+1	76.6	59.0	84,640	+7.9
Conservative	4	0	1	-1	13.3	22.1	31,685	+1.1
SLD	3	0	0	0	10.0	16.4	23,579	-11.3
SDP	0	0	0	0	0.0	1.8	2,591	New
Green	0	0	0	0	0.0	0.6	900	+0.5
Communist	0	0	0	0	0.0	0.1	161	±0.0

This result had the following consequences for the total number of seats on the Council after the elections:

Party	Previous council	New council
Labour	65	66
Conservatives	13	12
Social and Liberal Democrats	9	9
Total	87	87
Working majority	43	45

== Ward results ==
Beauchief
Party	Candidate	Votes	%	±%
Conservative	Danny George*	2,456	34.4	−2.3
SLD	Peter Moore	2,365	33.1	+0.2
Labour	Roy Munn	2,181	30.6	+0.2
SDP	Robert Shillito	128	1.8	+1.8
Majority		91	1.3	−2.5
Turnout		7,130	46.8	−6.3
Conservative hold		Swing	-1.2	

Birley
Party	Candidate	Votes	%	±%
Labour	Val Shepherd*	3,804	71.3	+11.5
Conservative	Gordon Millward	938	17.6	−0.4
SLD	Cyril Skipworth	588	11.0	−11.2
Majority		2,866	53.7	+16.1
Turnout		5,330	32.9	−6.3
Labour hold		Swing	+5.9	

Brightside
Party	Candidate	Votes	%	±%
Labour	Peter Price*	2,658	81.0	+9.9
Conservative	Jeremy Richardson	350	10.7	−1.0
SLD	Peter McNutt	270	8.2	−8.9
Majority		2,308	70.3	+16.3
Turnout		3,278	24.9	−6.8
Labour hold		Swing	+5.4	

Broomhill
Party	Candidate	Votes	%	±%
Labour	Kevin Mahoney	2,103	40.0	+1.7
Conservative	Sid Cordle**	1,960	37.3	+6.8
SLD	Jane Padget	742	14.1	−17.1
Green	Andrew Womack	347	6.6	+6.6
SDP	Oliver Waterlow	104	2.0	+2.0
Majority		143	2.7	−4.4
Turnout		5,256	38.0	−7.6
Labour gain from Conservative		Swing	-2.5	

Sid Cordle was a sitting councillor for Ecclesall ward

Burngreave
Party	Candidate	Votes	%	±%
Labour	Phyllis Smith**	2,846	72.7	+6.2
Labour	John Watson	2,702		
Conservative	Dianne Watson	543	13.9	+1.9
Conservative	Anne Smith	518		
SLD	Sheila Hughes	292	7.4	−14.1
SLD	Sheila Rehman	288		
SDP	Victoria Dean	155	3.9	+3.9
Communist	Brian Turley	76	1.9	+1.9
Majority		2,159	58.8	+13.8
Turnout		3,912	31.6	−4.9
Labour hold		Swing		
Labour hold		Swing	+2.1	

Phyllis Smith was a sitting councillor for Heeley ward

Castle
Party	Candidate	Votes	%	±%
Labour	Thomas Bower	2,795	84.3	+6.8
Conservative	Joan Graham	344	10.4	−0.3
SLD	Donald Smith	176	5.3	−6.4
Majority		2,451	73.9	+8.1
Turnout		3,315	25.6	−5.3
Labour hold		Swing	+3.5	

Chapel Green
Party	Candidate	Votes	%	±%
SLD	David Chadwick*	3,161	47.4	−6.8
Labour	Eldon Hanson	3,005	45.0	+6.0
Conservative	Cecilia Holt	403	6.0	−0.7
SDP	David Richie	103	1.5	+1.5
Majority		156	2.4	−12.8
Turnout		6,672	37.1	−9.8
SLD hold		Swing	-6.4	

Darnall
Party	Candidate	Votes	%	±%
Labour	Sandra Robinson	3,194	73.1	+9.8
Conservative	Philip Kirby	676	15.5	−0.8
SLD	Dennis Boothroyd	497	11.4	−9.0
Majority		2,518	57.6	+14.7
Turnout		4,367	29.2	−5.9
Labour hold		Swing	+5.3	

Dore
Party	Candidate	Votes	%	±%
Conservative	David Heslop*	3,685	57.2	+5.7
Labour	Glenn Ellis	1,850	28.7	+3.0
SLD	Janice Sidebottom	655	10.2	−12.6
SDP	Marguerite Crangle	248	3.8	+3.8
Majority		1,835	28.5	+2.7
Turnout		6,438	38.6	−9.4
Conservative hold		Swing	+1.3	

Ecclesall
Party	Candidate	Votes	%	±%
Conservative	Bobbie Fleming	3,515	54.3	+2.3
Labour	Timothy Plant	1,468	22.7	+3.3
SLD	Christine Freeman	1,044	16.1	−12.5
Green	Clare Jenkins	280	4.3	+4.3
SDP	Peter Sorby	165	2.5	+2.5
Majority		2,047	31.6	+8.2
Turnout		6,472	41.0	−7.9
Conservative hold		Swing	-0.5	

Firth Park
Party	Candidate	Votes	%	±%
Labour	Clive Betts*	3,475	82.7	+7.9
Conservative	Andrew Cook	367	8.7	+8.7
SLD	John Wilcock	235	5.6	−19.6
SDP	Glyn Evans	125	3.0	+3.0
Majority		3,108	74.0	+24.4
Turnout		4,202	30.5	−5.2
Labour hold		Swing	-0.4	

Hallam
Party	Candidate	Votes	%	±%
Conservative	Peter Jackson*	3,223	50.8	+1.3
Labour	John Webster	1,625	25.6	+6.2
SLD	John Knight	1,242	19.6	−11.4
SDP	Matthew Smith	256	4.0	+4.0
Majority		1,598	25.2	+6.7
Turnout		6,346	43.7	−1.1
Conservative hold		Swing	-2.4	

Handsworth
Party	Candidate	Votes	%	±%
Labour	Harold Lambert	3,588	63.7	+12.1
SLD	Alice Smith	1,317	23.4	−15.4
Conservative	Shirley Clayton	602	10.7	+1.5
Green	Roger Dunn	126	2.2	+1.9
Majority		2,271	40.3	+27.5
Turnout		5,633	37.8	−6.4
Labour hold		Swing	+13.7	

Heeley
Party	Candidate	Votes	%	±%
Labour	Edward Lamb	3,255	68.6	+10.7
Conservative	Elizabeth Bradbury	935	19.7	−1.3
SLD	Valerie King	381	8.0	−13.0
SDP	John Hetherington	170	3.6	+3.6
Majority		2,320	48.9	+12.0
Turnout		4,741	31.4	−7.4
Labour hold		Swing	+6.0	

Hillsborough
Party	Candidate	Votes	%	±%
Labour	Peter Duff	3,107	50.4	+3.6
SLD	David Swarbrick	1,813	29.4	−3.9
Conservative	Michael Warner	1,098	17.8	−2.0
Green	Jacqueline O'Neill	147	2.4	+2.4
Majority		1,294	21.0	+7.5
Turnout		6,165	40.1	−6.8
Labour hold		Swing	+3.7	

Intake
Party	Candidate	Votes	%	±%
Labour	Philip Moscrop*	3,181	67.7	+8.7
Conservative	Elizabeth Bradbury	1,067	22.7	+1.6
SLD	Douglas Oldfield	293	6.2	−13.6
SDP	David Dean	153	3.2	+3.2
Majority		2,114	45.0	+7.1
Turnout		4,694	29.8	−7.7
Labour hold		Swing	+3.5	

Manor
Party	Candidate	Votes	%	±%
Labour	Bill Jordan*	2,715	86.1	+6.9
Conservative	Paul Anderton	293	9.3	+0.2
SLD	Leonard Middleton	146	4.6	−7.0
Majority		2,422	76.8	+9.2
Turnout		3,154	30.0	
Labour hold		Swing	+3.3	

Mosborough
Party	Candidate	Votes	%	±%
Labour	Dorothy Walton*	4,328	67.7	+8.4
Conservative	Caroline Gracey	1,420	22.2	+0.7
SLD	Kevin Smith	402	6.3	−12.9
SDP	Roger Davison	239	3.7	+3.7
Majority		2,908	45.5	+7.7
Turnout		6,389	29.0	−6.6
Labour hold		Swing	+3.8	

Nether Edge
Party	Candidate	Votes	%	±%
Labour	Jan Fiore*	2,772	48.9	+10.4
Conservative	Henry Cornford	1,816	32.1	+3.4
SLD	George Manley	858	15.1	−14.3
SDP	Stephen Ruttle	216	3.8	+3.8
Majority		956	16.8	+7.7
Turnout		5,662	40.3	−6.0
Labour hold		Swing	+3.5	

Nether Shire
Party	Candidate	Votes	%	±%
Labour	Roger Barton*	3,439	82.1	+9.5
Conservative	Roger Barnsley	404	9.6	+9.6
SLD	George Clayton	344	8.2	−19.2
Majority		3,035	72.5	+27.3
Turnout		4,187	32.5	−2.8
Labour hold		Swing	-0.0	

Netherthorpe
Party	Candidate	Votes	%	±%
Labour	Jennifer Harvey	2,883	75.8	+6.5
Conservative	David Knight	519	13.6	−1.2
SLD	David Cloke	293	7.7	−8.1
SDP	Rachel Ritchie	106	2.8	+2.8
Majority		2,364	62.2	+8.7
Turnout		3,801	28.7	−9.6
Labour hold		Swing	+3.8	

Norton
Party	Candidate	Votes	%	±%
Labour	John Butler*	3,468	67.4	+8.0
Conservative	Russell Crane	1,221	23.7	+1.2
SLD	Ian Auckland	454	8.8	−9.3
Majority		2,247	43.7	+6.8
Turnout		5,143	38.4	−6.5
Labour hold		Swing	+3.4	

Owlerton
Party	Candidate	Votes	%	±%
Labour	George Burrows*	3,165	85.0	+16.4
SLD	Francis Pierce	459	12.3	−6.3
Conservative	Malcolm Smith	100	2.7	−10.0
Majority		2,706	72.7	+22.7
Turnout		3,724	29.1	−7.1
Labour hold		Swing	+11.3	

Park
Party	Candidate	Votes	%	±%
Labour	Alice Sargent	3,172	85.4	+6.9
Conservative	Mary Hyatt	309	8.3	−2.0
SLD	John Mayes	233	6.3	−4.9
Majority		2,863	77.1	+9.8
Turnout		3.714	26.2	−5.0
Labour hold		Swing	+4.4	

Sharrow
Party	Candidate	Votes	%	±%
Labour	Mike Pye*	2,619	72.7	+9.4
Conservative	Jane Godber	525	14.6	−4.2
SLD	Kathleen Brown	279	7.7	−8.0
SDP	Patricia Major	93	2.6	+2.6
Communist	Walter Hartley	85	2.3	+0.1
Majority		2,094	58.1	+13.6
Turnout		3,601	28.2	−5.7
Labour hold		Swing	+6.8	

South Wortley
Party	Candidate	Votes	%	±%
SLD	Alan Memmott*	2,796	39.6	−9.1
Labour	Roy Darke	2,708	38.3	+7.3
Conservative	Lynn Wilson	1,556	22.0	+1.8
Majority		88	1.3	−16.4
Turnout		7,060	38.1	−8.8
SLD hold		Swing	-8.2	

Southey Green
Party	Candidate	Votes	%	±%
Labour	Jimmy Boyce**	3,609	88.9	+7.6
Conservative	Robert Usher	242	5.9	+5.9
SLD	Raymond Mellor	209	5.1	−13.6
Majority		3,367	83.0	+20.4
Turnout		4,060	32.3	−3.6
Labour hold		Swing	+0.8	

Jimmy Boyce was a sitting councillor for Burngreave ward

Stocksbridge
Party	Candidate	Votes	%	±%
SLD	June Hibberd-Cooke*	1,636	43.7	−9.3
Labour	Alf Meade**	1,630	43.5	+7.6
Conservative	Stephen Gladman	399	10.6	−0.4
SDP	George Wilson	81	2.1	+2.1
Majority		6	0.2	−16.9
Turnout		3,746	35.7	−10.6
SLD hold		Swing	-8.4	

Alf Meade was a sitting councillor for Hillsborough ward

Walkley
Party	Candidate	Votes	%	±%
Labour	Jean Cromar*	3,997	74.5	+18.8
Conservative	Patricia Barnsley	719	13.4	+3.2
SLD	Penelope Smith	399	7.4	−26.6
SDP	Margaret Ritchie	249	4.6	+4.6
Majority		3,278	61.1	+39.4
Turnout		5,364	37.1	−6.6
Labour hold		Swing	+7.8	
