= 1986 Sheffield City Council election =

← 1984	8 May 1986	1987 →

30 of 87 seats to Sheffield City Council 44 seats needed for a majority
	First party	Second party	Third party
Party	Labour	Conservative	Alliance
Seats won	22	5	3
Seat change	▲2	▼2	0
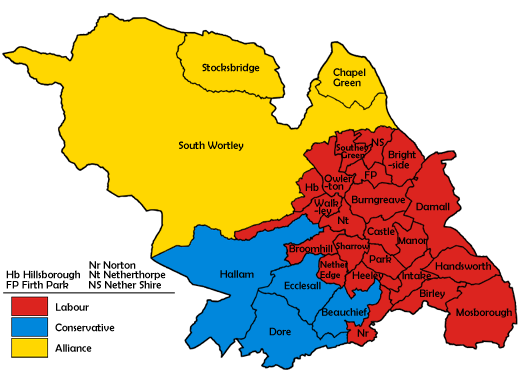
- Map showing the results of the 1986 Sheffield City Council elections.
Majority party before election
Labour Party (UK)
Majority party after election
Labour Party (UK)

Elections to Sheffield City Council were held on 8 May 1986. One third of the council was up for election. Since the 1984 election, the Conservatives had successfully defended two seats in Broomhill and Labour had held one of their Park seats in by-elections the following year.

== Election result ==
Sheffield local election result 1986
Party	Seats	Gains	Losses	Net gain/loss	Seats %	Votes %	Votes	+/−
Labour	22	2	0	+2	73.3	53.7	75,901	-0.9
Alliance	3	0	0	0	10.0	25.3	35,810	+4.8
Conservative	5	0	2	-2	16.6	20.0	28,267	-4.6
Independent Labour	0	0	0	0	0.0	0.5	700	N/A
Independent	0	0	0	0	0.0	0.2	279	N/A
Green	0	0	0	0	0.0	0.2	224	+0.1
Revolutionary Communist	0	0	0	0	0.0	0.1	128	New
Christian Ecology	0	0	0	0	0.0	0.1	84	New
Communist	0	0	0	0	0.0	0.0	64	-0.2

This result had the following consequences for the total number of seats on the Council after the elections:

Party	Previous council	New council
Labour	61	63
Conservatives	17	15
SDP–Liberal Alliance	9	9
Total	87	87
Working majority	35	39

== Ward results ==
Beauchief
Party	Candidate	Votes	%	±%
Conservative	Thomas Seaton	2,466	39.6	−14.7
Labour	George Munn**	2,319	37.2	+11.0
Alliance (SDP)	John White	1,440	23.1	+3.7
Majority		147	2.4	−25.7
Turnout		6,225	40.6	
Conservative hold		Swing	-12.8	

George Munn was a sitting councillor for Darnall ward

Birley
Party	Candidate	Votes	%	±%
Labour	Donald Gow	3,622	65.5	+1.6
Alliance (SDP)	Cyril Skipworth	1,152	20.8	+6.6
Conservative	George Salter	750	13.6	−8.3
Majority		2,470	44.7	+2.7
Turnout		5,524	34.0	
Labour hold		Swing	-2.5	

Brightside
Party	Candidate	Votes	%	±%
Labour	Rae Whitfield*	2,940	76.0	+5.7
Alliance (SDP)	George Wilson	604	15.6	−2.8
Conservative	Simon Braggs	325	8.4	−2.8
Majority		2,336	60.4	+8.5
Turnout		3,869	29.5	
Labour hold		Swing	+4.2	

Broomhill
Party	Candidate	Votes	%	±%
Labour	John Woodcock	2,222	39.8	+4.1
Alliance (SDP)	Jane Padget	1,763	31.6	+10.7
Conservative	Giles Orton	1,595	28.6	−14.8
Majority		459	8.2	+0.5
Turnout		5,580	41.8	
Labour gain from Conservative		Swing	-3.3	

Burngreave
Party	Candidate	Votes	%	±%
Labour	Brian Flanagan	3,237	79.6	+26.4
Alliance (Liberal)	Khalid Mahmood	831	20.4	−21.4
Majority		2,406	59.2	+47.8
Turnout		4,068	32.5	
Labour hold		Swing	+23.9	

Castle
Party	Candidate	Votes	%	±%
Labour	Peter Horton*	3,179	83.9	+6.0
Conservative	Joan Graham	377	9.9	−2.9
Alliance (SDP)	Muhammad Zahur	234	6.2	−2.0
Majority		2,802	74.0	+8.9
Turnout		3,790	29.1	
Labour hold		Swing	+4.4	

Chapel Green
Party	Candidate	Votes	%	±%
Alliance (Liberal)	Susan Ward	3,103	47.8	-8.3
Labour	Peter Duff	2,970	45.7	+9.0
Conservative	Mary Hyatt	418	6.4	−0.7
Majority		132	2.1	−17.3
Turnout		6,491	38.9	
Alliance hold		Swing	-8.6	

Darnall
Party	Candidate	Votes	%	±%
Labour	Choudry Walayat	1,899	42.1	−23.1
Alliance (Liberal)	Dennis Boothroyd	1,219	27.0	+13.2
Independent Labour	Sheila Rehman	700	15.5	+15.5
Conservative	Colin Cavill	686	15.2	−5.8
Majority		680	15.1	−29.1
Turnout		4,504	31.1	
Labour hold		Swing	-18.1	

Dore
Party	Candidate	Votes	%	±%
Conservative	Jack Thompson*	3,271	49.4	−9.0
Labour	Maureen Whitebrook	1,853	28.0	+2.6
Alliance (Liberal)	Edith Fawcett	1,498	22.6	+6.5
Majority		1,418	21.4	−11.6
Turnout		6,622	40.1	
Conservative hold		Swing	-5.8	

Ecclesall
Party	Candidate	Votes	%	±%
Conservative	Stuart Dawson	3,156	47.7	−8.6
Conservative	Jeremy Richardson	3,021		
Alliance (Liberal)	Arthur Fawthrop	2,117	32.0	+7.6
Alliance (Liberal)	Christine Freeman	1,975		
Labour	Roy Darke	1,343	20.3	+1.1
Labour	Jeane Cromar	1,335		
Majority		1,039	15.7	+10.4
Turnout		6,616	42.3	
Conservative hold		Swing		
Conservative hold		Swing	-8.1	

Firth Park
Party	Candidate	Votes	%	±%
Labour	Joan Barton*	3,470	80.6	+3.4
Conservative	Angela Knight	517	12.0	+1.2
Independent	Nisar Qureshi	279	6.5	+6.5
Revolutionary Communist	Carolyn Pryce	39	0.9	+0.9
Majority		2,953	68.6	+3.3
Turnout		4,305	30.8	
Labour hold		Swing	+1.1	

Hallam
Party	Candidate	Votes	%	±%
Conservative	Ian Fey	2,885	40.5	−14.4
Alliance (SDP)	John Knight	2,489	34.9	+10.4
Labour	Christopher Walker	1,749	24.5	+4.0
Majority		396	5.6	−24.8
Turnout		7,123	48.9	
Conservative hold		Swing	-12.4	

Handsworth
Party	Candidate	Votes	%	±%
Labour	Kenneth Hartley	3,582	69.2	+3.3
Alliance (SDP)	Marguerite Crangle	803	15.5	+2.3
Conservative	Shirley Clayton	707	13.6	−7.2
Christian Ecology	Roger Dunn	84	1.6	+1.6
Majority		2,779	53.7	+8.6
Turnout		5,176	34.2	
Labour hold		Swing	+0.5	

Heeley
Party	Candidate	Votes	%	±%
Labour	Mukesh Savani*	3,117	58.6	−2.4
Conservative	Nicholas Asiam	1,091	20.5	−5.9
Alliance (SDP)	Raymond Mellor	1,058	19.9	+7.4
Revolutionary Communist	Steven Brown	47	0.9	+0.9
Majority		2,026	38.1	+3.5
Turnout		5,313	35.0	
Labour hold		Swing	+1.7	

Hillsborough
Party	Candidate	Votes	%	±%
Labour	Penelope Peysner	3,235	50.2	−1.6
Alliance (Liberal)	Francis Butler	1,996	31.0	+6.4
Conservative	Michael Warner	1,213	18.8	−4.7
Majority		1,239	19.2	−8.0
Turnout		6,444	42.5	
Labour hold		Swing	-4.0	

Intake
Party	Candidate	Votes	%	±%
Labour	Deborah Matthews	3,188	61.2	+2.2
Conservative	Elizabeth Bradbury	1,153	22.1	−4.4
Alliance (SDP)	Francis Pierce	866	16.6	+2.1
Majority		2,035	39.1	+6.6
Turnout		5,207	32.9	
Labour hold		Swing	+3.3	

Manor
Party	Candidate	Votes	%	±%
Labour	Howard Capelin*	Unopposed	N/A	−82.0
Majority		N/A	N/A	
Turnout		N/A	N/A	
Labour hold		Swing	N/A	

Mosborough
Party	Candidate	Votes	%	±%
Labour	Ian Saunders	3,758	65.1	−1.9
Conservative	Evelyn Millward	1,022	17.7	−3.9
Alliance (SDP)	Hilary Gooch	995	17.2	+5.9
Majority		2,736	47.4	+2.0
Turnout		5,775	28.9	
Labour hold		Swing	+1.0	

Nether Edge
Party	Candidate	Votes	%	±%
Labour	Qurban Hussain	2,386	39.1	−4.0
Conservative	Christine Smith*	1,854	30.4	−9.2
Alliance (Liberal)	George Manley	1,628	26.7	+11.4
Green	Jane Beharrell	224	3.7	+1.9
Majority		532	8.7	+5.2
Turnout		6,092	43.9	
Labour gain from Conservative		Swing	+2.6	

Nether Shire
Party	Candidate	Votes	%	±%
Labour	Alan Wigfield*	3,453	78.4	+7.8
Alliance (SDP)	George Clayton	585	13.3	−4.9
Conservative	John Harrington	366	8.3	−2.8
Majority		2,868	65.1	+12.7
Turnout		4,404	33.2	
Labour hold		Swing	+6.3	

Netherthorpe
Party	Candidate	Votes	%	±%
Labour	James Steinke	2,986	73.6	+3.0
Alliance (Liberal)	Peter McNutt	1,072	26.4	+8.2
Majority		1,914	47.2	−5.2
Turnout		4,058	32.3	
Labour hold		Swing	-2.6	

Norton
Party	Candidate	Votes	%	±%
Labour	James Moore*	3,406	63.7	+0.9
Conservative	Nigel Ball	971	18.1	−6.6
Alliance (Liberal)	Anita Norris	967	18.1	+5.7
Majority		2,435	45.6	+7.5
Turnout		5,344	39.1	
Labour hold		Swing	+3.7	

Owlerton
Party	Candidate	Votes	%	±%
Labour	George Mathews*	2,918	74.0	−0.7
Alliance (Liberal)	Philip Taylor	583	14.8	+3.1
Conservative	Lorna Banham	440	11.1	−2.5
Majority		2,335	59.2	−2.1
Turnout		3,941	29.9	
Labour hold		Swing	-1.9	

Park
Party	Candidate	Votes	%	±%
Labour	Doris Mulhearn*	2,901	82.8	−0.2
Alliance (Liberal)	Donald Smith	332	9.5	+3.2
Conservative	Cissie Reynolds	269	7.7	−2.9
Majority		2,569	73.3	+0.9
Turnout		3,502	24.7	
Labour hold		Swing	-1.7	

Sharrow
Party	Candidate	Votes	%	±%
Labour	Ruth Midgley	2,440	64.7	−4.3
Alliance (SDP)	Mohammed Malik	648	17.2	−10.8
Conservative	Anne Smith	577	15.3	+15.3
Communist	Walter Hartley	64	1.7	−1.2
Revolutionary Communist	Edmund Price	42	1.1	+1.1
Majority		1,792	47.5	+6.5
Turnout		3,771	31.2	
Labour hold		Swing	+3.2	

South Wortley
Party	Candidate	Votes	%	±%
Alliance (Liberal)	Philip Howson*	3,601	47.7	+8.1
Labour	John Buckley	2,730	36.1	+1.1
Conservative	Elizabeth Conboy	1,223	16.2	−9.2
Majority		871	11.6	+7.0
Turnout		7,554	41.7	
Alliance hold		Swing	+3.5	

Southey Green
Party	Candidate	Votes	%	±%
Labour	Patricia Nelson	Unopposed	N/A	−85.4
Majority		N/A	N/A	
Turnout		N/A	N/A	
Labour hold		Swing	N/A	

Stocksbridge
Party	Candidate	Votes	%	±%
Alliance (Liberal)	Malcolm Brelsford*	1,896	47.6	-0.7
Labour	John Johnston	1,664	41.8	−0.0
Conservative	Beryl Fleming	420	10.5	+0.7
Majority		232	5.8	−0.7
Turnout		3,980	38.2	
Alliance hold		Swing	-0.3	

Walkley
Party	Candidate	Votes	%	±%
Labour	Carol Bullement	3,334	53.9	−8.4
Alliance (SDP)	David Brown	2,330	37.7	+15.3
Conservative	Paul Makin	515	8.3	−7.0
Majority		1,004	16.2	−23.7
Turnout		6,179	42.9	
Labour hold		Swing	-11.8	
