= 1991 Sheffield City Council election =

← 1990	2 May 1991	1992 →

30 of 87 seats to Sheffield City Council 44 seats needed for a majority
	First party	Second party	Third party
Party	Labour	Conservative	Liberal Democrats
Seats won	23	4	3
Seat change	▲1	▲1	▼1
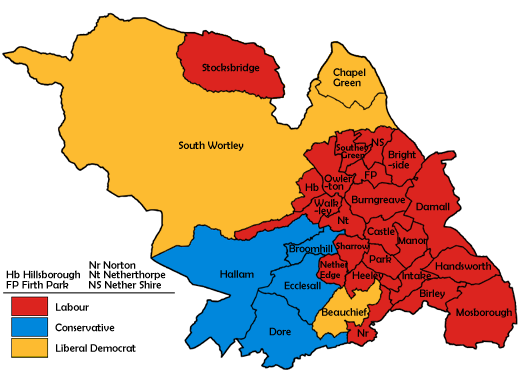
- Map showing the results of the 1991 Sheffield City Council elections.
Majority party before election
Labour Party (UK)
Majority party after election
Labour Party (UK)

Elections to Sheffield City Council were held on 2 May 1991. One third of the council was up for election. Since the previous election, Richard Old had defected from the Conservatives, sitting as an Independent Conservative. His failure to win re-election for the Ecclesall ward returned them to 11 seats.

== Election result ==
Sheffield local election result 1991
Party	Seats	Gains	Losses	Net gain/loss	Seats %	Votes %	Votes	+/−
Labour	23	2	1	+1	76.6	49.6	73,080	-12.6
Liberal Democrats	3	1	2	-1	10.0	24.7	36,307	+7.7
Conservative	4	2	1	+1	13.3	23.5	34,532	+5.6
Green	0	0	0	0	0.0	1.4	2,084	-1.4
Conservative Councillor Against Student Games	0	0	1	-1	0.0	0.5	711	N/A
Islamic Party	0	0	0	0	0.0	0.3	407	N/A
Wealth Redistribution	0	0	0	0	0.0	0.1	116	±0.0

This result had the following consequences for the total number of seats on the Council after the elections:

Party	Previous council	New council
Labour	69	70
Conservatives	10	11
Liberal Democrats	7	6
Conservative Councillor Against Student Games	1	0
Total	87	87
Working majority	51	53

== Ward results ==
Beauchief
Party	Candidate	Votes	%	±%
Liberal Democrats	Andrew Sangar	4,691	59.8	+13.0
Conservative	Frank Woodger	1,793	22.8	+1.2
Labour	Shafzat Mirza	1,356	17.3	−14.2
Majority		2,898	37.0	+21.7
Turnout		7,840	52.3	−6.1
Liberal Democrats gain from Conservative		Swing	+5.9	

Birley
Party	Candidate	Votes	%	±%
Labour	Joan Lumley	3,407	61.1	−14.4
Conservative	Eve Millward	1,204	21.6	+7.8
Liberal Democrats	Helen Woolley	966	17.3	+6.6
Majority		2,203	39.5	−22.2
Turnout		5,577	35.4	−6.6
Labour hold		Swing	-11.1	

Brightside
Party	Candidate	Votes	%	±%
Labour	Pat Heath*	2,519	69.1	−11.3
Conservative	Marjorie Kirby	575	15.8	+10.3
Liberal Democrats	Roger Hughes	551	15.1	+9.0
Majority		1,944	53.3	−19.2
Turnout		3,645	28.1	−7.8
Labour hold		Swing	-10.8	

Broomhill
Party	Candidate	Votes	%	±%
Conservative	Warwick Cornford	1,866	39.0	+5.9
Labour	Mukesh Savani*	1,598	33.4	−7.6
Liberal Democrats	Alan Wisbey	905	18.9	+8.7
Green	Mallen Baker	416	8.7	−6.9
Majority		268	5.6	−2.3
Turnout		4,785	34.1	−4.4
Conservative gain from Labour		Swing	+6.7	

Burngreave
Party	Candidate	Votes	%	±%
Labour	Jim Jamison*	2,257	65.6	−13.4
Conservative	Sam Shaw	521	15.1	+3.7
Liberal Democrats	Katherine Milsom	496	14.4	+6.1
Islamic Party	Mohammed Khan	166	4.8	+4.8
Majority		1,736	50.5	−17.1
Turnout		3,440	28.7	−8.6
Labour hold		Swing	-8.5	

Castle
Party	Candidate	Votes	%	±%
Labour	Mike Chaplin*	2,391	75.4	−8.2
Conservative	Anne Smith	400	12.6	+2.4
Liberal Democrats	Denis Boothroyd	379	11.9	+5.7
Majority		1,991	62.8	−10.6
Turnout		3,170	29.5	−10.8
Labour hold		Swing	-5.3	

Chapel Green
Party	Candidate	Votes	%	±%
Liberal Democrats	Audrey Trickett	4,113	55.7	+14.2
Labour	Bob Quick	2,741	37.1	−15.8
Conservative	Peter Smith	525	7.1	+1.6
Majority		1,372	18.6	+7.2
Turnout		7,379	40.6	−4.5
Liberal Democrats hold		Swing	+15.0	

Darnall
Party	Candidate	Votes	%	±%
Labour	Elsie Smith**	2,621	57.2	−8.1
Conservative	Philip Kirby	789	17.2	+3.7
Liberal Democrats	Francis Pierce	626	13.6	+2.7
Green	Chriss Ferguson	305	6.6	−3.6
Islamic Party	David Pidcock	241	5.2	+5.2
Majority		1,832	40.0	−11.8
Turnout		4,582	30.8	−4.1
Labour hold		Swing	-5.9	

Elsie Smith was a sitting councillor for Handsworth ward

Dore
Party	Candidate	Votes	%	±%
Conservative	Cliff Godber**	3,842	52.5	+1.6
Labour	Mike King	1,931	26.4	−8.5
Liberal Democrats	Tony Richmond	1,541	21.0	+6.9
Majority		1,551	26.1	+10.1
Turnout		7,314	44.3	−2.3
Conservative hold		Swing	+5.0	

Cliff Godber was a sitting councillor for Beauchief ward

Ecclesall
Party	Candidate	Votes	%	±%
Conservative	Angela Fry	3,260	45.5	−3.5
Liberal Democrats	Charles Ross	1,661	23.2	+8.2
Labour	Tim Plant	1,528	21.3	−6.3
Conservative Councillor Against Student Games	Richard Old*	711	9.9	+9.9
Majority		1,732	22.3	+0.9
Turnout		7,160	45.5	+0.0
Conservative gain from Ind. Conservative		Swing	-5.8	

Richard Old was previously elected as a Conservative councillor

Firth Park
Party	Candidate	Votes	%	±%
Labour	Howard Knight*	3,232	70.9	−13.8
Liberal Democrats	Doreen Huddart	783	17.2	+8.8
Conservative	Nazir Qureshi	541	11.9	+5.1
Majority		2,449	53.7	−22.6
Turnout		4,556	33.2	−7.2
Labour hold		Swing	-11.3	

Hallam
Party	Candidate	Votes	%	±%
Conservative	Angela Knight*	3,842	52.7	+6.1
Liberal Democrats	Roger Davison	1,615	22.1	+6.0
Labour	Andrew Nicolson	1,540	21.1	−9.3
Green	Peter Scott	290	4.0	−2.9
Majority		2,227	30.6	+14.4
Turnout		7,287	48.9	−2.7
Conservative hold		Swing	+0.0	

Handsworth
Party	Candidate	Votes	%	±%
Labour	Duncan Ironmonger	3,058	61.0	−10.4
Liberal Democrats	Anita Morris	1,078	21.5	+5.0
Conservative	Shirley Clayton	877	17.5	+7.1
Majority		2,980	39.5	−15.4
Turnout		5,013	33.7	−4.5
Labour hold		Swing	-7.9	

Heeley
Party	Candidate	Votes	%	±%
Labour	Jack Crowder*	2,971	58.8	−14.3
Liberal Democrats	Steve Ayris	1,089	21.5	+9.2
Conservative	Maureen Neill	995	19.7	+5.1
Majority		1,882	37.3	−21.2
Turnout		5,055	34.4	−6.5
Labour hold		Swing	-11.7	

Hillsborough
Party	Candidate	Votes	%	±%
Labour	Mike Buckley*	2,706	49.5	−8.2
Conservative	Les Seaton	1,293	23.6	+10.5
Liberal Democrats	Penny Baker	1,159	21.2	−1.8
Green	Peter Wood	307	5.6	−0.6
Majority		1,413	25.9	−8.8
Turnout		5,465	36.5	−5.6
Labour hold		Swing	-9.3	

Intake
Party	Candidate	Votes	%	±%
Labour	Jim Steinke*	2,776	56.4	−16.3
Conservative	Nicola Wilde	1,218	24.7	+7.8
Liberal Democrats	Susan Alston	929	18.9	+8.6
Majority		1,558	31.7	−24.1
Turnout		4,923	31.7	−8.0
Labour hold		Swing	-12.0	

Manor
Party	Candidate	Votes	%	±%
Labour	Paul Colk*	2,216	73.5	−13.0
Liberal Democrats	Melvin Lockey	415	13.7	+7.6
Conservative	Paul Anderton	385	12.7	+5.3
Majority		1,801	59.8	−19.3
Turnout		3,016	32.5	−10.4
Labour hold		Swing	-10.3	

Mosborough
Party	Candidate	Votes	%	±%
Labour	Roy Hattersley**	4,207	56.7	−17.0
Conservative	Gordon Millward	1,976	26.6	+10.5
Liberal Democrats	Louise Truman	1,229	16.6	+6.5
Majority		2,231	30.1	−27.5
Turnout		7,412	30.6	−4.3
Labour hold		Swing	-13.7	

Roy Hattersley was a sitting councillor for Darnall ward

Nether Edge
Party	Candidate	Votes	%	±%
Labour	Pat Midgley*	2,147	41.2	−4.0
Liberal Democrats	Greg Connor	1,754	33.7	+13.6
Conservative	Qari Siddique	1,307	25.1	+2.1
Majority		393	7.5	−14.7
Turnout		5,208	36.4	−3.2
Labour hold		Swing	-8.8	

Nether Shire
Party	Candidate	Votes	%	±%
Labour	Steve Jones*	2,774	69.5	−11.5
Liberal Democrats	Andrew McKerrow	676	16.9	+6.6
Conservative	Lyne Wilson	539	13.5	+4.8
Majority		2,098	52.6	−18.1
Turnout		3,989	31.2	−10.7
Labour hold		Swing	-9.0	

Netherthorpe
Party	Candidate	Votes	%	±%
Labour	Tony Arber	2,202	60.3	−11.5
Liberal Democrats	Tony Murray-Adams	533	14.6	+8.0
Conservative	David Knight	522	14.3	+2.5
Green	Barry New	396	10.8	+1.1
Majority		1,669	45.7	−14.3
Turnout		3,653	27.4	−9.1
Labour hold		Swing	-9.7	

Norton
Party	Candidate	Votes	%	±%
Labour	Frank White*	2,882	55.5	−15.4
Conservative	Russell Crane	1,220	23.5	+4.6
Liberal Democrats	Chris Tutt	1,093	21.0	+10.8
Majority		1,662	32.0	−20.0
Turnout		5,195	40.1	−6.1
Labour hold		Swing	-10.0	

Owlerton
Party	Candidate	Votes	%	±%
Labour	Carol Schofield	2,632	67.1	−13.2
Liberal Democrats	Katherine Taylor	674	17.2	+7.3
Conservative	Andrew Cook	618	15.7	+5.9
Majority		1,958	49.9	−20.5
Turnout		3,924	30.9	−7.5
Labour hold		Swing	-10.2	

Park
Party	Candidate	Votes	%	±%
Labour	Viv Nicholson*	2,656	74.9	−12.4
Liberal Democrats	Sheila Hughes	496	14.0	+7.5
Conservative	Maisie Hyatt	395	11.1	+4.9
Majority		2,160	60.9	−19.9
Turnout		3,547	26.5	−9.2
Labour hold		Swing	-9.9	

Sharrow
Party	Candidate	Votes	%	±%
Labour	Doris Askham*	2,150	62.9	−13.3
Liberal Democrats	Kath Brown	580	17.0	+4.8
Conservative	Paul Makin	571	16.7	+5.2
Wealth Redistribution	Simon Rawlins	116	3.4	+3.4
Majority		1,570	45.9	−18.1
Turnout		3,417	27.7	−6.9
Labour hold		Swing	-9.0	

South Wortley
Party	Candidate	Votes	%	±%
Liberal Democrats	Trevor Bagshaw	3,359	43.4	−0.2
Labour	Chris Prescott	2,813	36.3	−4.2
Conservative	Mollie Goldring	1,572	20.3	+4.5
Majority		546	7.1	+4.0
Turnout		7,744	41.6	−4.1
Liberal Democrats hold		Swing	+2.0	

Southey Green
Party	Candidate	Votes	%	±%
Labour	Tony Damms*	3,007	78.2	−10.6
Liberal Democrats	Stuart Bridge	483	12.5	+6.1
Conservative	Mark Whittingham	353	9.2	+4.5
Majority		2,524	65.7	−16.7
Turnout		3,843	31.4	−9.4
Labour hold		Swing	-8.3	

Stocksbridge
Party	Candidate	Votes	%	±%
Labour	Joan Brown	1,922	47.8	−2.6
Labour	Alan Law	1,758		
Liberal Democrats	Maureen Brelsford	1,478	36.7	−4.2
Liberal Democrats	Andrew Pritchard	904		
Conservative	C. Blundell	622	15.4	+6.7
Conservative	Anne Smith	620		
Majority		280	11.1	+1.6
Turnout		4,022	34.0	−12.3
Labour gain from Liberal Democrats		Swing		
Labour gain from Liberal Democrats		Swing	+0.8	

Walkley
Party	Candidate	Votes	%	±%
Labour	Bill Owen*	2,840	55.9	−14.3
Liberal Democrats	Penny Blythe	955	18.8	+9.5
Conservative	Michael Warner	911	17.9	+6.3
Green	Jeanette Moon	370	7.3	−1.5
Majority		1,885	37.1	−21.5
Turnout		5,076	34.4	−8.3
Labour hold		Swing	-11.9	
