= 1995 Sheffield City Council election =

← 1994	5 May 1995	1996 →

30 of 87 seats to Sheffield City Council 44 seats needed for a majority
	First party	Second party	Third party
Party	Labour	Liberal Democrats	Conservative
Seats won	22	8	0
Seat change	▲2	▲3	▼4
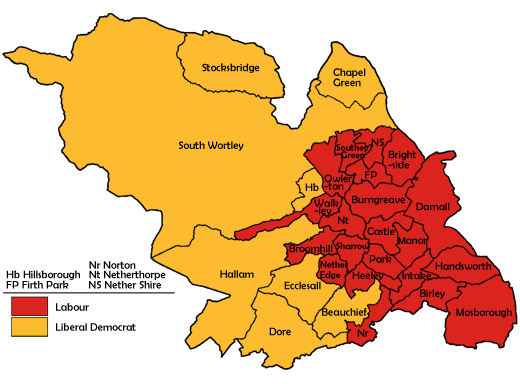
- Map showing the results of the 1995 Sheffield City Council elections.
Majority party before election
Labour Party (UK)
Majority party after election
Labour Party (UK)

Elections to Sheffield City Council were held on 5 May 1995. One third of the council was up for election.

== Election results ==
Sheffield local election result 1995
Party	Seats	Gains	Losses	Net gain/loss	Seats %	Votes %	Votes	+/−
Labour	22	4	2	+2	73.3	47.4	61,546	+6.2
Liberal Democrats	8	5	2	+3	26.7	38.9	50,583	-3.2
Conservative	0	0	4	-4	0.0	11.4	14,761	-1.9
Green	0	0	0	0	0.0	0.8	1,082	-0.4
Independent Labour	0	0	1	-1	0.0	0.8	983	+0.5
Militant Labour	0	0	0	0	0.0	0.6	794	+0.2
Ind. Conservative	0	0	0	0	0.0	0.1	104	N/A
International Communist	0	0	0	0	0.0	0.0	37	New

This result had the following consequences for the total number of seats on the council after the elections:

Party	Previous council	New council
Labour	56	58
Liberal Democrats	22	25
Conservatives	8	4
Independent Labour	1	0
Total	87	87
Working majority	25	29

== Ward results ==
Beauchief
Party	Candidate	Votes	%	±%
Liberal Democrats	Andrew Sangar*	3,569	60.0	−4.5
Labour	Grant Blackwell	1,701	28.6	+6.7
Conservative	Shirley Trueman	672	11.3	−0.6
Majority		1,868	31.4	−11.2
Turnout		5,942	40.6	−8.7
Liberal Democrats hold		Swing	-5.6	

Birley
Party	Candidate	Votes	%	±%
Labour	Elsie Smith**	3,054	63.6	+8.5
Liberal Democrats	Andrew Plant	1,240	25.8	−5.5
Conservative	Margaret Pigott	510	10.6	−3.0
Majority		1,814	37.8	+14.0
Turnout		4,804	40.6	+4.5
Labour hold		Swing	+7.0	

Elsie Smith was a sitting councillor for Darnall ward

Brightside
Party	Candidate	Votes	%	±%
Labour	John Webster	2,079	54.6	+7.0
Liberal Democrats	Gail Smith*	1,610	42.2	−3.3
Conservative	Michael Quirke	121	3.2	−1.6
Majority		469	12.4	+10.3
Turnout		3,810	30.0	−3.7
Labour gain from Liberal Democrats		Swing	+5.1	

The Liberal Democrats had gained the Brightside seat in a by-election

Broomhill
Party	Candidate	Votes	%	±%
Labour	Judith Belcher	2,054	44.8	+6.4
Liberal Democrats	Janice Sidebottom	1,389	30.3	−1.6
Conservative	Warwick Cornford*	950	20.7	−3.5
Green	Joseph Otten	188	4.1	+0.7
Majority		665	14.5	+8.0
Turnout		4,581	27.6	−7.0
Labour gain from Conservative		Swing	+4.0	

Burngreave
Party	Candidate	Votes	%	±%
Labour	Stephen Jones**	1,346	41.3	−19.8
Independent Labour	James Jamison*	983	30.1	+30.1
Liberal Democrats	Asif Yaqub	719	22.0	+2.6
Conservative	David Knight	213	6.5	−1.2
Majority		363	11.2	−30.5
Turnout		3,261	29.2	+1.3
Labour gain from Independent Labour		Swing	-24.9	

Stephen Jones was a sitting councillor for Nether Shire ward and James Jamison was previously elected as a Labour councillor

Castle
Party	Candidate	Votes	%	±%
Labour	Patricia Midgley**	1,884	75.3	+8.3
Liberal Democrats	Ian Auckland	326	13.0	−6.3
Conservative	Ann Smith	163	6.5	−2.7
Green	Graham Wroe	91	3.6	−0.8
International Communist	Christopher Marsden	37	1.5	+1.5
Majority		1,558	62.3	+14.6
Turnout		2,501	22.2	−3.2
Labour hold		Swing	+7.3	

Patricia Midgley was a sitting councillor for Nether Edge ward

Chapel Green
Party	Candidate	Votes	%	±%
Liberal Democrats	Joan Trickett*	3,667	58.5	−2.6
Labour	Eldon Hanson	2,379	38.0	+4.4
Conservative	Peter Smith	217	3.4	−1.9
Majority		1,288	20.5	−7.0
Turnout		6,263	34.6	−5.8
Liberal Democrats hold		Swing	-3.5	

Darnall
Party	Candidate	Votes	%	±%
Labour	Kashaf Walayat	2,058	48.1	+1.0
Liberal Democrats	John Martin	1,646	38.5	+6.2
Conservative	Laurence Hayward	344	8.0	−4.7
Green	Gordon Ferguson	229	5.3	−2.5
Majority		412	9.6	−5.2
Turnout		4,277	29.1	−1.2
Labour hold		Swing	-2.6	

Dore
Party	Candidate	Votes	%	±%
Liberal Democrats	Peter Fox	2,538	40.6	−4.5
Conservative	John Paul Harthman	2,393	38.3	+2.3
Labour	Richard Pearce	1,310	21.0	+3.9
Majority		145	2.3	−6.8
Turnout		6,241	39.3	−6.0
Liberal Democrats gain from Conservative		Swing	-3.4	

Ecclesall
Party	Candidate	Votes	%	±%
Liberal Democrats	Sylvia Dunkley	2,963	46.4	+4.2
Conservative	Angela Elaine Fry*	1,856	29.1	−4.8
Labour	Judith Gwynn	1,563	24.5	+5.9
Majority		1,107	17.3	+9.0
Turnout		6,382	40.5	−5.0
Liberal Democrats gain from Conservative		Swing	+4.5	

Firth Park
Party	Candidate	Votes	%	±%
Labour	Ian Leedham	2,238	66.7	+1.3
Labour	Alan Law*	2,176		
Liberal Democrats	Mohammed Azim	907	27.0	+0.9
Liberal Democrats	Susan Cutts	803		
Conservative	Mary Hyatt	208	6.2	−2.3
Conservative	Qari Siddique	167		
Majority		1,269	39.7	+0.4
Turnout		3,353	25.1	−3.5
Labour hold		Swing		
Labour hold		Swing	+0.2	

Hallam
Party	Candidate	Votes	%	±%
Liberal Democrats	Leonard Hesketh	2,683	43.3	−7.1
Conservative	Charles Wallis	1,877	30.3	−1.4
Labour	Michael Smith	1,466	23.6	+8.0
Green	Peter Scott	172	2.8	+0.6
Majority		806	13.0	−5.7
Turnout		6,198	41.7	−8.3
Liberal Democrats gain from Conservative		Swing	-2.8	

Handsworth
Party	Candidate	Votes	%	±%
Labour	Marjorie Barker	3,038	66.3	+16.3
Liberal Democrats	Louise Truman	1,212	26.4	−13.7
Conservative	Shirley Clayton	334	7.3	−2.5
Majority		1,862	39.9	+30.0
Turnout		4,584	32.0	−3.6
Labour hold		Swing	+15.0	

Heeley
Party	Candidate	Votes	%	±%
Labour	Beverley Ann Wright	2,439	48.9	+8.4
Liberal Democrats	Robert Watson	2,317	46.5	−6.0
Conservative	Eric Prescott Smith	229	4.6	−0.1
Majority		122	2.4	−10.1
Turnout		4,985	35.4	−7.9
Labour hold		Swing	+7.2	

Hillsborough
Party	Candidate	Votes	%	±%
Liberal Democrats	Alison MacFarlane	2,528	48.5	−2.3
Labour	Barnaby Mynott	2,296	44.0	+7.3
Conservative	Joyce Gairnster	391	7.5	−3.0
Majority		232	4.5	−9.6
Turnout		5,215	35.4	−6.4
Liberal Democrats gain from Labour		Swing	-4.8	

Intake
Party	Candidate	Votes	%	±%
Labour	David Lawton*	2,390	50.3	+4.9
Liberal Democrats	Christopher Tutt	2,101	44.2	+3.8
Conservative	Francis Woodger	263	5.5	−5.5
Majority		289	6.1	+1.1
Turnout		4,754	31.7	−2.1
Labour hold		Swing	+0.5	

Manor
Party	Candidate	Votes	%	±%
Labour	William Jordan*	1,609	65.9	−0.8
Liberal Democrats	Roy Denton	480	19.6	−5.6
Militant Labour	Steven Tice	200	8.2	+8.2
Conservative	Andrew Watson	153	6.2	−1.8
Majority		1,129	46.3	+4.8
Turnout		2,442	26.7	−3.7
Labour hold		Swing	+2.4	

Mosborough
Party	Candidate	Votes	%	±%
Labour	Chris Rosling-Josephs	3,938	62.5	+10.2
Liberal Democrats	Allan Wisbey	1,370	21.7	−12.0
Conservative	Kay Hill	886	14.1	+0.2
Ind. Conservative	Colin Taylor	104	1.6	+1.6
Majority		2,568	40.8	+22.2
Turnout		6,298		
Labour hold		Swing	+11.1	

Nether Edge
Party	Candidate	Votes	%	±%
Labour	Andrew Hinman	2,334	45.0	+10.0
Liberal Democrats	Ali Qadar	2,320	44.7	−5.3
Conservative	Brian Trueman	534	10.3	+0.8
Majority		14	0.3	−14.8
Turnout		5,188	37.6	−3.7
Labour hold		Swing	+7.6	

Nether Shire
Party	Candidate	Votes	%	±%
Labour	William Eddison	2,230	67.4	+11.4
Liberal Democrats	Peter MacLoughlin	866	26.2	−9.7
Conservative	Marjorie Kirby	213	6.4	−1.8
Majority		1,372	41.2	+21.1
Turnout		3,309	26.7	−5.0
Labour hold		Swing	+10.5	

Netherthorpe
Party	Candidate	Votes	%	±%
Labour	Antony Arber*	1,993	52.7	+14.5
Liberal Democrats	Howard Middleton	1,387	36.6	+3.1
Green	Barry New	235	6.2	−3.7
Conservative	Andrew McTurk Cook	168	4.4	−1.1
Majority		546	16.1	+11.4
Turnout		3,783	30.0	−1.8
Labour hold		Swing	+5.7	

Norton
Party	Candidate	Votes	%	±%
Labour	Frank White*	2,217	48.0	+1.4
Liberal Democrats	Ruth Dawson	1,979	42.8	+3.8
Conservative	Albert Marsden	424	9.2	−5.2
Majority		238	5.2	−2.4
Turnout		4,620	37.6	−2.6
Labour hold		Swing	-1.2	

Owlerton
Party	Candidate	Votes	%	±%
Labour	James Bamford	2,025	67.4	+8.6
Liberal Democrats	Markus Sova	735	24.4	−3.6
Conservative	Clive Dearden	245	8.1	−1.2
Majority		1,290	43.0	+12.2
Turnout		3,005	24.4	−5.0
Labour hold		Swing	+6.1	

Park
Party	Candidate	Votes	%	±%
Labour	Vivienne Nicholson*	1,568	56.7	+6.7
Militant Labour	Kenneth Douglas	594	21.5	+0.9
Liberal Democrats	Sheila Hughes	450	16.3	−5.0
Conservative	Michael Ginn	153	5.5	−2.5
Majority		974	35.2	+6.5
Turnout		2,765	22.2	−4.0
Labour hold		Swing	+2.9	

Sharrow
Party	Candidate	Votes	%	±%
Labour	Mohammad Nazir	1,941	57.7	+2.6
Liberal Democrats	Andrew White	1,198	35.6	+1.8
Conservative	Michael Anthony Young	226	6.7	+0.1
Majority		743	22.1	+0.8
Turnout		3,365	35.9	+4.5
Labour hold		Swing	+0.4	

South Wortley
Party	Candidate	Votes	%	±%
Liberal Democrats	Trevor Bagshaw*	3,703	56.7	−3.1
Labour	Bernard Steer	2,310	35.3	+5.1
Conservative	Gary Meggitt	520	7.9	−2.2
Majority		1,397	21.4	−8.2
Turnout		6,533	35.9	−6.4
Liberal Democrats hold		Swing	-4.1	

Southey Green
Party	Candidate	Votes	%	±%
Labour	Anthony Damms*	2,231	78.7	+11.3
Liberal Democrats	Wayne Morton	461	16.2	−7.8
Conservative	David Marriott	143	5.0	−3.6
Majority		1,770	62.5	+19.1
Turnout		2,835	25.0	−2.7
Labour hold		Swing	+9.5	

Stocksbridge
Party	Candidate	Votes	%	±%
Liberal Democrats	Alan Pears	1,692	53.7	−1.3
Labour	Joan Brown*	1,297	41.1	+4.6
Conservative	Anne Smith	163	5.2	−3.3
Majority		395	12.6	−5.8
Turnout		3,152	29.6	−9.7
Liberal Democrats gain from Labour		Swing	-2.9	

Walkley
Party	Candidate	Votes	%	±%
Labour	Terry Barrow	2,558	47.0	+4.9
Liberal Democrats	Diane Leek*	2,527	46.4	−2.6
Conservative	Molly Goldring	192	3.5	−1.7
Green	Nicola Watson	167	3.1	−0.7
Majority		31	0.6	−6.3
Turnout		5,444		
Labour gain from Liberal Democrats		Swing	+3.7	

The Liberal Democrats had gained the Walkley seat in a by-election
