= 1990 Sheffield City Council election =

City Council Elections

← 1988	4 May 1990	1991 →

33 of 87 seats to Sheffield City Council 44 seats needed for a majority
	First party	Second party	Third party
Party	Labour	Conservative	Liberal Democrats
Seats won	29	3	1
Seat change	▲3	▼1	▼2
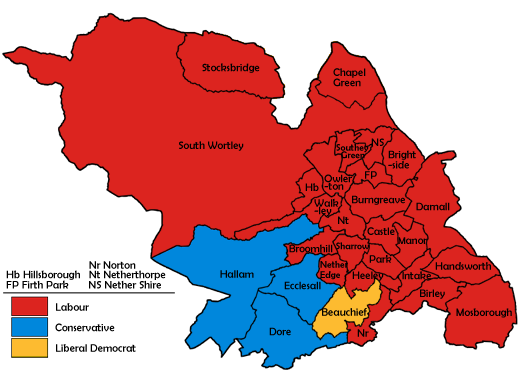
- Map showing the results of the 1990 Sheffield City Council elections.
Majority party before election
Labour Party (UK)
Majority party after election
Labour Party (UK)

Elections to Sheffield City Council were held on 4 May 1990. One third of the council was up for election.

== Election result ==
Sheffield local election result 1990
Party	Seats	Gains	Losses	Net gain/loss	Seats %	Votes %	Votes	+/−
Labour	29	3	0	+3	87.9	62.2	105,937	+3.2
Conservative	3	0	1	-1	9.1	17.9	30,435	-4.2
Liberal Democrats	1	1	3	-2	3.0	17.0	29,041	+0.6
Green	0	0	0	0	0.0	2.8	4,738	+2.2
No Poll Tax	0	0	0	0	0.0	0.1	96	N/A
Alternative Development, Small is Beautiful	0	0	0	0	0.0	0.1	92	N/A
International Communist	0	0	0	0	0.0	0.0	56	N/A

This result had the following consequences for the total number of seats on the Council after the elections:

Party	Previous council	New council
Labour	66	69
Conservatives	12	11
Liberal Democrats	9	7
Total	87	87
Working majority	45	51

== Ward results ==
Beauchief
Party	Candidate	Votes	%	±%
Liberal Democrats	Peter Moore	4,126	46.8	+13.7
Labour	Anne Sheehan	2,780	31.5	+0.9
Conservative	Caroline Gracey	1,905	21.6	−12.8
Majority		1,346	15.3	+14.0
Turnout		8,811	58.4	+11.6
Liberal Democrats gain from Conservative		Swing	+6.4	

Birley
Party	Candidate	Votes	%	±%
Labour	Donald Gow*	5,061	75.5	+4.2
Conservative	Gordon Millward	925	13.8	−3.8
Liberal Democrats	Andrea Morris	715	10.7	−0.3
Majority		4,136	61.7	+8.0
Turnout		6,701	42.0	+9.1
Labour hold		Swing	+4.0	

Brightside
Party	Candidate	Votes	%	±%
Labour	Rae Whitfield*	3,716	80.4	−0.6
Green	Richard Griffiths	366	7.9	+7.9
Liberal Democrats	John Wilcock	281	6.1	−2.1
Conservative	Mary Hyatt	257	5.5	−5.2
Majority		3,360	72.5	+2.2
Turnout		4,620	35.9	+11.0
Labour hold		Swing	-4.2	

Broomhill
Party	Candidate	Votes	%	±%
Labour	Richard Eastall	2,101	41.0	+1.0
Labour	Mukesh Savani**	1,950		
Conservative	Henry Cornford	1,697	33.1	−4.2
Conservative	Marjorie Kirby	1,651		
Green	Bernard Little	802	15.6	+9.0
Green	Michael Mallen	718		
Liberal Democrats	Andrew Milton	523	10.2	−3.9
Liberal Democrats	Allan Wisbey	461		
Majority		253	7.9	+5.2
Turnout		5,123	38.5	+0.5
Labour hold		Swing		
Labour hold		Swing	+2.6	

Mukesh Savani was a sitting councillor for Heeley ward

Burngreave
Party	Candidate	Votes	%	±%
Labour	John Watson*	3,454	79.0	+6.3
Conservative	Samuel Shaw	497	11.4	−2.5
Liberal Democrats	Andrew Sangar	362	8.3	+0.9
International Communist	Michael England	56	1.3	+1.3
Majority		2,957	67.6	+8.8
Turnout		4,369	37.3	+5.7
Labour hold		Swing	+4.4	

Castle
Party	Candidate	Votes	%	±%
Labour	Peter Horton*	3,358	83.6	−0.7
Labour	Michael Chaplin	3,282		
Conservative	Joan Graham	410	10.2	−0.2
Liberal Democrats	Dennis Boothroyd	248	6.2	+0.9
Conservative	Francis Woodger	242		
Majority		2,872	73.4	−0.5
Turnout		4,016	40.3	+14.7
Labour hold		Swing		
Labour hold		Swing	-0.2	

Chapel Green
Party	Candidate	Votes	%	±%
Labour	Laurence Kingham	4,358	52.9	+7.9
Liberal Democrats	Graham Oxley	3,424	41.5	−5.9
Conservative	John Davey	458	5.5	−0.5
Majority		934	11.4	+9.0
Turnout		8,240	45.1	+8.0
Labour gain from Liberal Democrats		Swing	+6.9	

Darnall
Party	Candidate	Votes	%	±%
Labour	Mohammed Walayat*	3,393	65.3	−7.8
Conservative	Colin Cavill	701	13.5	−2.0
Liberal Democrats	Sheila Rehman	570	10.9	−0.5
Green	Gordon Ferguson	532	10.2	+10.2
Majority		2,692	51.8	−5.8
Turnout		5,196	34.9	+5.7
Labour hold		Swing	-2.9	

Dore
Party	Candidate	Votes	%	±%
Conservative	Diana Leech	3,930	50.9	−6.3
Labour	Glenn Ellis	2,694	34.9	+6.2
Liberal Democrats	Anthony Richmond	1,089	14.1	+3.9
Majority		1,236	16.0	−12.5
Turnout		7,713	46.6	+8.0
Conservative hold		Swing	-6.2	

Ecclesall
Party	Candidate	Votes	%	±%
Conservative	Stuart Dawson*	3,526	49.0	−5.3
Labour	Timothy Plant	1,985	27.6	+4.9
Liberal Democrats	Colin Ross	1,078	15.0	−1.1
Green	Leela Spencer	601	8.3	+4.0
Majority		1,541	21.4	−10.2
Turnout		7,192	45.5	+4.5
Conservative hold		Swing	-5.1	

Firth Park
Party	Candidate	Votes	%	±%
Labour	Joan Barton*	4,693	84.7	+2.0
Liberal Democrats	Andrew McKerrow	467	8.4	+2.8
Conservative	Andrew Cook	380	6.8	−1.9
Majority		4,226	76.3	+2.3
Turnout		5,540	40.4	+9.9
Labour hold		Swing	-0.4	

Hallam
Party	Candidate	Votes	%	±%
Conservative	Graham Lawson	3,508	46.6	−4.2
Labour	Andrew Nicolson	2,293	30.4	+4.8
Liberal Democrats	John Knight	1,212	16.1	−3.5
Green	Peter Scott	518	6.9	+6.9
Majority		1,215	16.2	−9.0
Turnout		7,531	51.6	+7.9
Conservative hold		Swing	-4.5	

Handsworth
Party	Candidate	Votes	%	±%
Labour	Kenneth Hartley*	4,054	71.4	+7.7
Liberal Democrats	Anita Morris	935	16.5	−6.9
Conservative	Shirley Clayton	592	10.4	−0.3
Alternative Development, Small is Beautiful	Roger Dunn	92	1.6	+1.6
Majority		3,119	54.9	+14.6
Turnout		5,673	38.2	+0.4
Labour hold		Swing	+7.3	

Heeley
Party	Candidate	Votes	%	±%
Labour	Roy Darke	4,361	73.1	+4.5
Conservative	Elizabeth Bradbury	871	14.6	−5.1
Liberal Democrats	Stephen Ayris	733	12.3	+4.3
Majority		3,490	58.5	+9.6
Turnout		5,965	40.9	+9.5
Labour hold		Swing	+4.8	

Hillsborough
Party	Candidate	Votes	%	±%
Labour	Patricia Waugh	3,639	57.7	+7.3
Liberal Democrats	Lynette Jackson	1,450	23.0	−6.4
Conservative	Michael Warner	828	13.1	−4.7
Green	Peter Wood	391	6.2	+3.8
Majority		2,189	34.7	+13.7
Turnout		6,308	42.1	+2.0
Labour hold		Swing	+6.8	

Intake
Party	Candidate	Votes	%	±%
Labour	Katherine Sheldrick	4,346	72.7	+5.0
Labour	James Steinke**	3,864		
Conservative	Robert Atha	1,012	16.9	−5.8
Conservative	Steven Fulbrook	840		
Liberal Democrats	Susan Alston	619	10.3	+4.1
Liberal Democrats	Katherine Milsom	535		
Majority		2,852	55.8	+10.8
Turnout		5,977	39.7	+9.9
Labour hold		Swing		
Labour hold		Swing	+5.4	

James Steinke was a sitting councillor for Netherthorpe ward

Manor
Party	Candidate	Votes	%	±%
Labour	Howard Capelin*	3,485	86.5	+0.4
Conservative	Paul Anderton	299	7.4	−1.9
Liberal Democrats	Leonard Middleton	245	6.1	+1.5
Majority		3,186	79.1	+2.3
Turnout		4,029	42.9	+12.9
Labour hold		Swing	+1.1	

Mosborough
Party	Candidate	Votes	%	±%
Labour	Ian Saunders*	6,063	73.7	+6.0
Conservative	Philip Kirby	1,330	16.1	−6.1
Liberal Democrats	Louise Truman	834	10.1	+3.8
Majority		4,733	57.6	+12.1
Turnout		8,227	34.9	+5.9
Labour hold		Swing	+6.0	

Nether Edge
Party	Candidate	Votes	%	±%
Labour	Qurban Hussain*	2,477	45.2	−3.7
Conservative	Anne Smith	1,260	23.0	−9.1
Liberal Democrats	Gregory Connor	1,103	20.1	+5.0
Green	Jill Margaret	547	10.0	+10.0
No Poll Tax	Simon Rawlins	96	1.7	+1.7
Majority		1,217	22.2	+5.4
Turnout		5,483	39.6	−0.7
Labour hold		Swing	+2.7	

Nether Shire
Party	Candidate	Votes	%	±%
Labour	Alan Wigfield*	4,070	81.0	−1.1
Labour	Hazel Ellery	3,949		
Liberal Democrats	Francis Pierce	516	10.3	+2.1
Conservative	Maureen Neill	436	8.7	−0.9
Conservative	Jeremy Richardson	362		
Majority		3,433	70.7	−1.8
Turnout		5,022	41.9	+9.4
Labour hold		Swing		
Labour hold		Swing	-1.6	

Netherthorpe
Party	Candidate	Votes	%	±%
Labour	Michael Bower	3,232	71.8	−4.0
Conservative	David Knight	530	11.8	−1.8
Green	Barry New	436	9.7	+9.7
Liberal Democrats	David Cloke	300	6.6	−1.1
Majority		2,702	60.0	−2.2
Turnout		4,498	36.5	+7.8
Labour hold		Swing	-1.1	

Norton
Party	Candidate	Votes	%	±%
Labour	James Moore*	4,245	70.9	+3.5
Conservative	Albert Marsden	1,133	18.9	−4.8
Liberal Democrats	Christopher Tutt	609	10.2	+1.4
Majority		3,112	52.0	+8.3
Turnout		5,987	46.2	+7.8
Labour hold		Swing	+4.1	

Owlerton
Party	Candidate	Votes	%	±%
Labour	George Mathews*	3,848	80.3	−4.7
Liberal Democrats	Kathryn Taylor	474	9.9	−2.4
Conservative	Jane Harries	469	9.8	+7.1
Majority		3,374	70.4	−2.3
Turnout		4,791	37.4	+8.3
Labour hold		Swing	-1.1	

Park
Party	Candidate	Votes	%	±%
Labour	Doris Mulhearn*	4,176	87.3	+1.9
Liberal Democrats	Sheila Hughes	311	6.5	+0.2
Conservative	Clare Fenner	297	6.2	−2.1
Majority		3,865	80.8	+3.7
Turnout		4,784	35.7	+9.5
Labour hold		Swing	+0.8	

Sharrow
Party	Candidate	Votes	%	±%
Labour	Catherine Whitty	3,058	76.2	+3.5
Liberal Democrats	Kathleen Brown	492	12.2	+4.5
Conservative	Paul Makin	464	11.5	−3.1
Majority		2,566	64.0	+5.9
Turnout		4,014	34.6	+6.4
Labour hold		Swing	-0.5	

South Wortley
Party	Candidate	Votes	%	±%
Labour	John Webster	3,691	43.6	+5.3
Liberal Democrats	Trevor Bagshaw	3,424	40.5	+0.9
Conservative	Lynn Wilson	1,339	15.8	−6.2
Majority		267	3.1	+1.8
Turnout		8,454	45.7	+7.6
Labour gain from Liberal Democrats		Swing	+2.2	

Southey Green
Party	Candidate	Votes	%	±%
Labour	Patricia Nelson*	4,511	88.8	−0.1
Liberal Democrats	Nic Chilton	328	6.4	+1.3
Conservative	Robert Usher	242	4.7	−1.2
Majority		4,183	82.4	−0.6
Turnout		5,081	40.8	+8.5
Labour hold		Swing	-0.7	

Stocksbridge
Party	Candidate	Votes	%	±%
Labour	Alfred Meade	2,459	50.4	+6.9
Liberal Democrats	Maureen Brelsford	1,997	40.9	−2.8
Conservative	Russell Crane	425	8.7	−1.9
Majority		462	9.5	+9.3
Turnout		4,881	46.3	+10.6
Labour gain from Liberal Democrats		Swing	+4.8	

Walkley
Party	Candidate	Votes	%	±%
Labour	Carol Bullement*	4,336	70.2	−4.3
Conservative	Christine Blundell	714	11.6	−1.8
Liberal Democrats	Penelope Baker	576	9.3	+1.9
Green	Nicola Watson	545	8.8	+8.8
Majority		3,622	58.6	−2.5
Turnout		6,171	42.7	+5.6
Labour hold		Swing	-1.2	
