= 1996 Sheffield City Council election =

← 1995	3 May 1996	1998 →

30 of 87 seats to Sheffield City Council 44 seats needed for a majority
	First party	Second party	Third party
Party	Labour	Liberal Democrats	Conservative
Seats won	17	12	1
Seat change	▼3	▲6	▼3
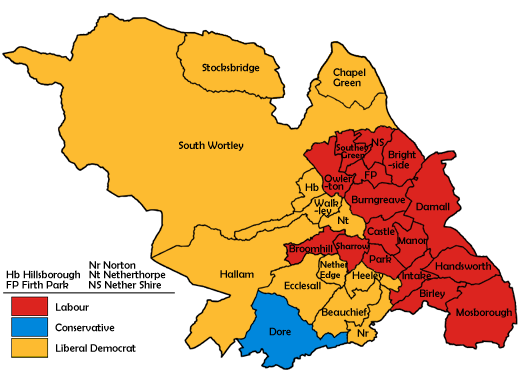
- Map showing the results of the 1996 Sheffield City Council elections.
Majority party before election
Labour Party (UK)
Majority party after election
Labour Party (UK)

Elections to Sheffield City Council were held on 3 May 1996. One third of the council was up for election.

== Election result ==
Sheffield local election result 1996
Party	Seats	Gains	Losses	Net gain/loss	Seats %	Votes %	Votes	+/−
Labour	17	1	4	-3	56.6	43.7	50,497	-3.7
Liberal Democrats	12	6	0	+6	40.0	41.1	47,536	+2.2
Conservative	1	0	3	-3	3.3	13.3	15,401	+1.9
Independent Labour	0	0	0	0	0.0	0.6	672	-0.2
Militant Labour	0	0	0	0	0.0	0.6	648	±0.0
Green	0	0	0	0	0.0	0.6	645	-0.2
Ind. Conservative	0	0	0	0	0.0	0.1	121	±0.0

This result had the following consequences for the total number of seats on the Council after the elections:

Party	Previous council	New council
Labour	58	55
Liberal Democrats	25	31
Conservatives	4	1
Total	87	87
Working majority	29	23

== Ward results ==
Beauchief
Party	Candidate	Votes	%	±%
Liberal Democrats	Roger Hughes*	3,142	57.3	+2.7
Labour	Robert Pemberton	1,555	28.4	+0.2
Conservative	Frank Woodger	785	14.3	−3.0
Majority		1,587	28.9	+2.5
Turnout		5,482	37.5	+3.1
Liberal Democrats hold		Swing	+1.2	

Birley
Party	Candidate	Votes	%	±%
Labour	Paul Colk	2,337	61.8	−1.8
Liberal Democrats	Michael Ogden	973	25.7	−0.1
Conservative	Laurence Hayward	470	12.4	+1.8
Majority		1,364	36.1	−1.7
Turnout		3,780	26.0	−14.6
Labour hold		Swing	-0.8	

Brightside
Party	Candidate	Votes	%	±%
Labour	Peter Price*	1,619	56.4	+1.8
Liberal Democrats	Wayne Morton	1,105	38.5	−3.7
Conservative	Marjorie Kirby	144	5.0	+1.8
Majority		514	17.9	+5.5
Turnout		2,868	23.8	−6.2
Labour hold		Swing	+2.7	

Broomhill
Party	Candidate	Votes	%	±%
Labour	Angela Smith	1,915	45.0	+0.2
Liberal Democrats	Janice Sidebottom	1,366	32.1	+1.8
Conservative	Derwent Levick*	970	22.8	+2.1
Majority		549	12.9	−1.6
Turnout		4,251	28.2	+0.6
Labour gain from Conservative		Swing	-0.8	

Burngreave
Party	Candidate	Votes	%	±%
Labour	Jacqueline Field	1,457	55.2	+13.9
Independent Labour	James Jamison	672	25.5	−4.6
Liberal Democrats	David Robinson	330	12.5	−9.5
Conservative	Mary Hyatt	178	6.7	+0.2
Majority		785	29.7	+18.5
Turnout		2,637	27.6	−1.6
Labour hold		Swing	+9.2	

Castle
Party	Candidate	Votes	%	±%
Labour	Barney Mynott	1,356	65.0	−10.3
Liberal Democrats	Howard Middleton	330	15.8	+2.8
Militant Labour	Peter Fryer	172	8.2	+8.2
Conservative	Michael Young	158	7.6	+1.1
Green	Graham Wroe	172	3.3	−0.3
Majority		1,026	49.2	−13.1
Turnout		2,085	20.7	−1.5
Labour hold		Swing	-6.5	

Chapel Green
Party	Candidate	Votes	%	±%
Liberal Democrats	Kathleen Chadwick*	3,105	59.2	+0.7
Labour	Susan Greaves	1,899	36.2	−1.8
Conservative	Michael Boot	243	4.6	+1.2
Majority		1,206	23.0	+2.5
Turnout		5,247	29.2	−5.4
Liberal Democrats hold		Swing	+1.2	

Darnall
Party	Candidate	Votes	%	±%
Labour	Steve Barnard	1,916	59.0	+10.9
Liberal Democrats	John Martin	1,006	31.0	−7.5
Conservative	Qari Siddique	324	10.0	+2.0
Majority		910	28.0	+18.4
Turnout		3,246	22.9	−6.2
Labour hold		Swing	+9.2	

Dore
Party	Candidate	Votes	%	±%
Conservative	David Heslop*	2,913	45.0	+6.7
Liberal Democrats	Gail Smith	2,545	39.3	−1.3
Labour	Richard Pearce	1,009	15.6	−5.4
Majority		368	5.7	+3.4
Turnout		6,467	42.6	+3.3
Conservative hold		Swing	+4.0	

Ecclesall
Party	Candidate	Votes	%	±%
Liberal Democrats	Kate Dawson	3,223	48.4	+2.0
Conservative	John Harthman	2,137	32.1	+3.0
Labour	Brendan Kitchen	1,301	19.5	−5.0
Majority		1,086	16.3	−1.0
Turnout		6,661	42.6	+2.1
Liberal Democrats gain from Conservative		Swing	-0.5	

Firth Park
Party	Candidate	Votes	%	±%
Labour	Alan Law*	1,814	63.3	−3.4
Labour	Mohammed Ilyas	1,612		
Liberal Democrats	Susan Cutts	748	26.1	−0.9
Liberal Democrats	Jonathan Harston	658		
Conservative	Khalid Mahmood	302	10.5	+4.3
Conservative	Brian Trueman	209		
Majority		1,066	37.2	−2.5
Turnout		2,864	24.0	−1.1
Labour hold		Swing		
Labour hold		Swing	-1.2	

Hallam
Party	Candidate	Votes	%	±%
Liberal Democrats	John Knight	3,199	52.4	+9.1
Conservative	Charles Wallis	1,743	28.5	−1.8
Labour	Ian White	1,164	19.0	−4.6
Majority		1,456	23.8	+10.8
Turnout		6,106	41.1	−0.6
Liberal Democrats gain from Conservative		Swing	+5.4	

Handsworth
Party	Candidate	Votes	%	±%
Labour	Michael Rooney	2,402	65.2	−1.1
Liberal Democrats	Louise Truman	890	24.1	−2.3
Conservative	Shirley Clayton	393	10.6	+3.3
Majority		1,512	41.0	+1.1
Turnout		3,685	25.7	−6.3
Labour hold		Swing	+0.6	

Heeley
Party	Candidate	Votes	%	±%
Liberal Democrats	Robert Watson	2,363	49.9	+3.4
Labour	David Hayes*	2,159	45.6	−3.3
Conservative	Eric Smith	215	4.5	−0.1
Majority		204	4.3	+1.9
Turnout		4,737	34.7	−0.7
Liberal Democrats gain from Labour		Swing	+3.3	

Hillsborough
Party	Candidate	Votes	%	±%
Liberal Democrats	Peter Macloughlin	2,765	54.9	+6.4
Labour	Robert Harpham	2,008	39.9	−4.1
Conservative	Simon Dawson	261	5.2	−2.3
Majority		757	15.0	+10.5
Turnout		5,034	35.4	−0.0
Liberal Democrats gain from Labour		Swing	+5.2	

Intake
Party	Candidate	Votes	%	±%
Labour	Janet Wilson*	1,960	55.9	+5.6
Liberal Democrats	Edward Fairhurst	1,130	32.2	−12.0
Conservative	Mark Cashin	414	11.8	+6.3
Majority		830	23.7	+17.6
Turnout		3,504	24.0	−7.7
Labour hold		Swing	+8.8	

Manor
Party	Candidate	Votes	%	±%
Labour	Michael Smith	1,245	65.9	−0.0
Liberal Democrats	Roy Denton	347	18.3	−1.3
Militant Labour	Alistair Tice	163	8.6	+0.4
Conservative	Andrew Watson	135	7.1	+0.9
Majority		898	47.5	+1.2
Turnout		1,890	21.4	−5.3
Labour hold		Swing	+0.6	

Mosborough
Party	Candidate	Votes	%	±%
Labour	Dorothy Walton*	3,176	59.8	−2.7
Liberal Democrats	David Caldwell	1,205	22.7	+1.0
Conservative	Brenden Doyle	810	15.2	+1.1
Ind. Conservative	Colin Taylor	121	2.3	+0.7
Majority		1,971	37.1	−3.7
Turnout		5,312	20.7	
Labour hold		Swing	-1.8	

Nether Edge
Party	Candidate	Votes	%	±%
Liberal Democrats	Ali Qadar	2,601	49.3	+4.6
Labour	William Eldridge	1,969	37.3	−7.7
Conservative	Ian Ramsay	446	8.4	−1.9
Green	Ronald Giles	261	4.9	+4.9
Majority		632	12.0	+11.7
Turnout		5,277	40.0	+2.4
Liberal Democrats hold		Swing	+6.1	

Nether Shire
Party	Candidate	Votes	%	±%
Labour	Jane Bird*	1,696	60.7	−6.7
Liberal Democrats	John Tomlinson	922	33.0	+6.8
Conservative	Margaret Piggott	176	6.3	−0.1
Majority		774	27.7	−13.5
Turnout		2,794	23.8	−2.9
Labour hold		Swing	-6.7	

Netherthorpe
Party	Candidate	Votes	%	±%
Liberal Democrats	Sylvia Anginotti*	1,876	50.8	+14.2
Labour	Ernest Hardy	1,497	40.5	−12.2
Green	Barry New	212	5.7	−0.5
Conservative	Andrew Cook	109	2.9	−1.5
Majority		379	10.2	−5.9
Turnout		3,694	30.2	+0.2
Liberal Democrats hold		Swing	+13.2	

Norton
Party	Candidate	Votes	%	±%
Liberal Democrats	Christopher Tutt	2,370	52.5	+9.7
Labour	Grant Blackwell	1,828	40.5	−7.5
Conservative	Shirley Trueman	314	6.9	−2.3
Majority		542	12.0	+6.8
Turnout		4,512	39.0	+1.4
Liberal Democrats gain from Labour		Swing	+8.6	

Owlerton
Party	Candidate	Votes	%	±%
Labour	David Jones*	1,588	60.0	−7.4
Liberal Democrats	Markus Sova	809	30.6	+6.2
Conservative	Clive Dearden	249	9.4	+1.3
Majority		779	29.4	−13.6
Turnout		2,646	22.7	−1.7
Labour hold		Swing	-6.8	

Park
Party	Candidate	Votes	%	±%
Labour	Joan Lumley	1,275	60.8	+4.1
Liberal Democrats	Sheila Hughes	362	17.3	+1.0
Militant Labour	Ken Douglas	313	14.9	-6.6
Conservative	Michael Ginn	146	7.0	+1.5
Majority		913	43.5	+8.3
Turnout		2,096	19.4	−2.8
Labour hold		Swing	+1.5	

Sharrow
Party	Candidate	Votes	%	±%
Labour	Michael Pye*	1,727	64.2	+6.5
Liberal Democrats	Andrew White	753	28.0	−7.6
Conservative	Anne Smith	211	7.8	+1.1
Majority		974	36.2	+14.1
Turnout		2,691	21.5	−14.4
Labour hold		Swing	+7.0	

South Wortley
Party	Candidate	Votes	%	±%
Liberal Democrats	Arthur Dunworth*	3,252	59.0	+2.3
Labour	Peter Rippon	1,631	29.6	−5.7
Conservative	Thomas Pigott	630	11.4	+3.5
Majority		1,621	29.4	+8.0
Turnout		5,513	30.1	−5.8
Liberal Democrats hold		Swing	+4.0	

Southey Green
Party	Candidate	Votes	%	±%
Labour	John Butler*	1,693	74.0	−4.7
Liberal Democrats	Kathleen Key	449	19.6	+3.4
Conservative	David Marriot	146	6.4	+1.4
Majority		1,244	54.4	−8.1
Turnout		2,288	21.9	−3.1
Labour hold		Swing	+4.0	

Stocksbridge
Party	Candidate	Votes	%	±%
Liberal Democrats	Maureen Brelsford*	1,636	56.0	+2.3
Labour	Sylvia Parry	1,092	37.4	−3.7
Conservative	Anne Smith	191	6.5	+1.3
Majority		544	18.6	+6.0
Turnout		2,919	27.5	−2.1
Liberal Democrats hold		Swing	+3.0	

Walkley
Party	Candidate	Votes	%	±%
Liberal Democrats	Diane Leek	2,734	53.3	+6.9
Labour	Jean Cromar*	2,209	43.0	−4.0
Conservative	Peter Smith	188	3.6	+0.1
Majority		525	10.2	+9.6
Turnout		5,131	36.9	
Liberal Democrats gain from Labour		Swing	+5.4	
