= 1998 Sheffield City Council election =

← 1996	7 May 1998	1999 →

29 of 87 seats to Sheffield City Council 44 seats needed for a majority
	First party	Second party	Third party
Party	Liberal Democrats	Labour	Conservative
Seats won	16	13	0
Seat change	▲5	▼5	0
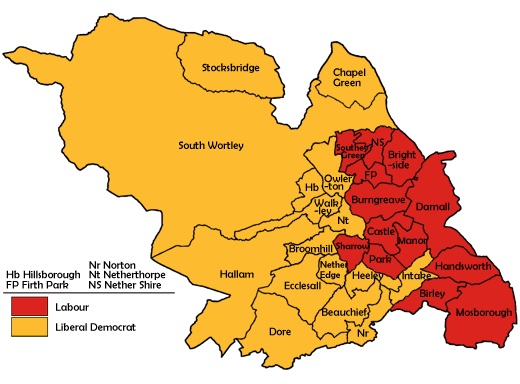
- Map showing the results of the 1998 Sheffield City Council elections.
Majority party before election
Labour Party (UK)
Majority party after election
Labour Party (UK)

Elections to Sheffield City Council were held on 7 May 1998. One third of the council was up for election, and the Labour Party kept overall control of the council.

== Election results ==
Sheffield local election result 1998
Party	Seats	Gains	Losses	Net gain/loss	Seats %	Votes %	Votes	+/−
Liberal Democrats	16	5	0	+5	55.2	50.2	50,109	+9.1
Labour	13	0	5	-5	44.8	35.6	35,521	-8.1
Conservative	0	0	0	0	0.0	11.8	11,749	-1.5
Green	0	0	0	0	0.0	1.2	1,216	+0.6
Independent Labour	0	0	0	0	0.0	0.6	565	±0.0
Socialist Alternative	0	0	0	0	0.0	0.4	387	-0.2
Ind. Conservative	0	0	0	0	0.0	0.1	95	±0.0
Socialist Labour	0	0	0	0	0.0	0.1	82	New
Socialist Alliance	0	0	0	0	0.0	0.1	76	New
Socialist Workers	0	0	0	0	0.0	0.0	58	New

This result had the following consequences for the total number of seats on the Council after the elections:

Party	Previous council	New council
Labour	55	50
Liberal Democrats	31	36
Conservatives	1	1
Total	87	87
Working majority	23	13

== Ward results ==
Beauchief
Party	Candidate	Votes	%	±%
Liberal Democrats	Peter Moore*	3,134	65.4	+8.1
Labour	Robert Pemberton	1,099	22.9	−5.5
Conservative	Peter Smith	561	11.7	−2.6
Majority		2,035	42.4	+13.5
Turnout		4,794	32.8	−4.7
Liberal Democrats hold		Swing	+6.8	

Birley
Party	Candidate	Votes	%	±%
Labour	Ron Shepherd	1,658	52.8	−9.0
Liberal Democrats	Derek Glossop	1,084	34.5	+8.8
Conservative	Evelyn Millward	400	12.7	+0.3
Majority		574	18.3	−17.8
Turnout		3,142	21.6	−4.4
Labour hold		Swing	-8.9	

Brightside
Party	Candidate	Votes	%	±%
Labour	Alf Meade*	1,214	55.5	−0.9
Liberal Democrats	Jonathan Harston	728	33.3	−5.2
Conservative	Phillip Kirby	162	7.4	+2.4
Socialist Labour	Robert Morris	82	3.7	+3.7
Majority		486	22.2	+4.3
Turnout		2,186	18.2	−5.6
Labour hold		Swing	+2.1	

Broomhill
Party	Candidate	Votes	%	±%
Liberal Democrats	Alan Whitehouse	1,905	50.4	+18.3
Labour	Richard Eastall*	1,083	28.7	−16.3
Conservative	Graham King	662	17.5	−5.3
Green	Joe Otten	128	3.4	+3.4
Majority		822	21.7	+8.8
Turnout		3,778	25.1	−3.1
Liberal Democrats gain from Labour		Swing	+10.0	

Burngreave
Party	Candidate	Votes	%	±%
Labour	John Watson*	724	36.5	−18.7
Independent Labour	James Jamison	565	28.4	+2.9
Liberal Democrats	Haq Nawaz	359	18.1	+5.6
Conservative	Anthony Cherry	177	8.9	+2.2
Green	Bernard Little	84	4.2	+4.2
Socialist Alliance	Ms M Woodward	76	3.8	+3.8
Majority		159	18.4	−24.3
Turnout		1,985	20.8	−6.8
Labour hold		Swing	-10.8	

Castle
Party	Candidate	Votes	%	±%
Labour	Mike King	885	56.4	−8.6
Liberal Democrats	Jim Morland	364	23.2	+7.4
Conservative	Michael Young	123	7.8	+0.2
Socialist Alternative	Rebecca Fryer	103	6.5	−1.7
Green	Graham Wroe	95	6.0	+2.7
Majority		521	33.2	−16.0
Turnout		1,570	15.6	−5.1
Labour hold		Swing	-8.0	

Chapel Green
Party	Candidate	Votes	%	±%
Liberal Democrats	Francis Butler*	3,086	65.2	+6.0
Labour	Mark Wilde	1,421	30.0	−6.2
Conservative	Michael Boot	226	4.8	+0.2
Majority		1,665	35.2	+12.2
Turnout		4,733	26.4	−2.8
Liberal Democrats hold		Swing	+6.1	

Darnall
Party	Candidate	Votes	%	±%
Labour	R Murray	1,761	54.0	−5.0
Liberal Democrats	Mohammad Azim	1,257	38.5	+7.5
Conservative	Qari Siddique	245	7.5	−2.5
Majority		504	15.4	−5.0
Turnout		3,263	23.0	+0.1
Labour hold		Swing	-6.2	

Dore
Party	Candidate	Votes	%	±%
Liberal Democrats	Colin Ross*	3,757	59.1	+19.8
Conservative	John Berry	1,999	31.4	−13.6
Labour	M Squires	599	9.4	−6.2
Majority		1,758	27.6	+21.9
Turnout		6,355	41.9	−0.7
Liberal Democrats hold		Swing	+16.7	

Ecclesall
Party	Candidate	Votes	%	±%
Liberal Democrats	Roger Davison*	3,437	59.5	+11.1
Conservative	John Harthman	1,616	28.0	−4.0
Labour	Sandra Robinson	724	12.5	−7.0
Majority		1,821	31.5	+15.2
Turnout		5,777	36.9	+5.7
Liberal Democrats hold		Swing	+7.5	

Firth Park
Party	Candidate	Votes	%	±%
Labour	Joan Barton*	1,532	63.1	−0.2
Liberal Democrats	F Khan	618	25.4	−0.7
Conservative	Neville Paling	277	11.4	+0.9
Majority		914	37.6	+0.4
Turnout		2,427	20.3	−3.7
Labour hold		Swing	+0.2	

Hallam
Party	Candidate	Votes	%	±%
Liberal Democrats	Duncan Kime*	3,488	61.4	+9.0
Conservative	Charles Wallis	1,459	25.7	−2.8
Labour	Martin Newsome	730	12.8	−6.2
Majority		2,029	35.7	+11.9
Turnout		5,677	38.2	−2.9
Liberal Democrats hold		Swing	+5.9	

Handsworth
Party	Candidate	Votes	%	±%
Labour	Ray Satur*	1,660	54.7	−10.5
Liberal Democrats	Howard Middleton	1,036	34.1	+10.0
Conservative	Laurence Hayward	338	11.1	+0.5
Majority		624	20.6	−20.4
Turnout		3,034	21.2	−4.5
Labour hold		Swing	-10.2	

Heeley
Party	Candidate	Votes	%	±%
Liberal Democrats	Steve Ayris*	2,258	57.1	+7.2
Labour	Andy Kershaw	1,540	38.9	−6.7
Conservative	Eric Smith	158	4.0	−0.5
Majority		718	18.1	+13.8
Turnout		3,956	29.0	−5.7
Liberal Democrats hold		Swing	+6.9	

Hillsborough
Party	Candidate	Votes	%	±%
Liberal Democrats	Christine Tosseano*	2,581	58.7	+3.8
Labour	Gill Furniss	1,580	35.9	−4.0
Conservative	Molly Goldring	238	5.4	+0.2
Majority		1,001	22.7	+7.7
Turnout		4,399	30.9	−4.5
Liberal Democrats hold		Swing	+3.9	

Intake
Party	Candidate	Votes	%	±%
Liberal Democrats	Louise Truman	1,960	55.2	+23.0
Labour	Freda White*	1,328	37.4	−18.5
Conservative	Eric Kirby	259	7.3	−4.5
Majority		632	17.8	−5.9
Turnout		3,547	24.3	+0.3
Liberal Democrats gain from Labour		Swing	+20.7	

Manor
Party	Candidate	Votes	%	±%
Labour	Jan Fiore*	895	57.7	−8.2
Liberal Democrats	Frank Taylor	477	30.7	+12.4
Conservative	Andrew Watson	108	6.9	−0.2
Socialist Alternative	Alistair Tice	71	4.6	−4.0
Majority		418	26.9	−20.6
Turnout		1,551	17.6	−3.8
Labour hold		Swing	-10.3	

Mosborough
Party	Candidate	Votes	%	±%
Labour	Ian Saunders*	2,258	51.8	−8.0
Liberal Democrats	Anders Hanson	1,284	29.5	+6.8
Conservative	Shirley Clayton	720	16.5	+1.3
Ind. Conservative	Colin Taylor	95	2.2	−0.1
Majority		974	22.3	−14.8
Turnout		4,357	16.9	−3.8
Labour hold		Swing	-7.4	

Nether Edge
Party	Candidate	Votes	%	±%
Liberal Democrats	Andrew White	2,176	52.4	+3.1
Labour	P Proctor	1,438	34.6	−2.7
Conservative	Ian Ramsay	287	6.9	−1.5
Green	Andy D'Agorne	254	6.1	+1.2
Majority		738	17.7	+5.7
Turnout		4,155	31.5	−8.5
Liberal Democrats hold		Swing	+2.9	

Nether Shire
Party	Candidate	Votes	%	±%
Labour	Doreen Newton*	1,260	53.3	−7.4
Liberal Democrats	John Tomlinson	940	39.7	+6.7
Conservative	Marjorie Kirby	164	6.9	+0.6
Majority		320	13.5	−14.2
Turnout		2,364	20.1	−3.7
Labour hold		Swing	-7.0	

Netherthorpe
Party	Candidate	Votes	%	±%
Liberal Democrats	Brian Holmes	1,895	58.1	+7.3
Labour	Mike Bower*	1,067	32.7	−7.8
Green	Barry New	165	5.0	−0.7
Conservative	Andrew Cook	74	2.3	−0.6
Socialist Workers	Ms J Grunsell	58	1.8	+1.8
Majority		828	25.4	+15.2
Turnout		3,259	26.7	−3.5
Liberal Democrats gain from Labour		Swing	+7.5	

Norton
Party	Candidate	Votes	%	±%
Liberal Democrats	Gail Smith	2,089	56.2	+3.7
Labour	James Moore*	1,375	37.0	−3.5
Conservative	Frank Woodger	255	6.8	−0.1
Majority		714	19.2	+7.2
Turnout		3,719	32.1	−6.9
Liberal Democrats gain from Labour		Swing	+3.6	

Owlerton
Party	Candidate	Votes	%	±%
Liberal Democrats	Trefor Morgan	1,100	47.1	+16.5
Labour	George Mathews*	1,081	46.3	−13.7
Conservative	Kevin Mahoney	154	6.6	−2.8
Majority		19	0.8	−28.6
Turnout		2,335	20.5	−2.2
Liberal Democrats gain from Labour		Swing	+15.1	

Park
Party	Candidate	Votes	%	±%
Labour	Doris Mulhern*	779	50.9	−9.9
Liberal Democrats	K Joyce	439	28.7	+11.4
Socialist Alternative	Ken Douglas	213	13.9	−1.0
Conservative	Michael Ginn	99	6.5	−0.5
Majority		340	22.2	−21.3
Turnout		1,530	14.1	−5.3
Labour hold		Swing	-10.6	

Sharrow
Party	Candidate	Votes	%	±%
Labour	Jean Cromar	1,110	53.0	−11.2
Liberal Democrats	Patricia White	628	30.0	+2.0
Conservative	A Lander	206	9.8	+2.0
Green	Mervyn Smith	149	7.1	+7.1
Majority		482	23.0	−13.2
Turnout		2,093	16.7	−4.8
Labour hold		Swing	-6.6	

South Wortley
Party	Candidate	Votes	%	±%
Liberal Democrats	Victoria Bowden*	3,147	62.8	+3.8
Labour	Adam Hurst	1,284	25.6	−4.0
Conservative	Ms B Gaimster	437	8.7	−2.7
Green	Michael Maas	142	2.8	+2.8
Majority		1,863	37.2	+7.8
Turnout		5,010	27.4	−2.7
Liberal Democrats hold		Swing	+3.9	

Southey Green
Party	Candidate	Votes	%	±%
Labour	P Rose	1,237	61.5	−12.5
Liberal Democrats	Sheila Tomlinson	700	34.8	+15.2
Conservative	George Kirtley	74	3.7	−2.7
Majority		537	26.7	−27.7
Turnout		2,011	19.2	−2.7
Labour hold		Swing	-13.8	

Stocksbridge
Party	Candidate	Votes	%	±%
Liberal Democrats	Martin Brelsford	1,689	64.5	+8.5
Labour	A Chapman	774	29.6	−7.8
Conservative	Anne Smith	153	5.8	−0.7
Majority		915	35.0	+16.4
Turnout		2,616	24.6	−2.9
Liberal Democrats hold		Swing	+8.1	

Walkley
Party	Candidate	Votes	%	±%
Liberal Democrats	Andrew Milton*	2,493	58.9	+5.6
Labour	Alan Garner	1,425	33.6	−9.4
Green	Nicola Freeman	199	4.7	+4.7
Conservative	Peter Smith	118	2.8	−0.8
Majority		1,068	25.2	+14.9
Turnout		4,235	30.4	−6.5
Liberal Democrats hold		Swing	+7.5	

== By-elections between 1998 and 1999 ==
Park by-election, 14 January 1999
Party	Candidate	Votes	%	±%
Liberal Democrats	Elizabeth Taylor	838	48.6	+19.9
Labour		737	42.8	−8.1
Socialist Alternative		104	6.0	−7.9
Conservative		24	1.4	−5.1
Independent Green	Pete Hartley	20	1.2	+1.2
Majority		101	5.8	−16.4
Turnout		1,723	18.4	+4.3
Liberal Democrats gain from Labour		Swing	+14.0	
