= 1994 Sheffield City Council election =

← 1992	5 May 1994	1995 →

32 of 87 seats to Sheffield City Council 44 seats needed for a majority
	First party	Second party	Third party
Party	Labour	Liberal Democrats	Conservative
Seats won	20	12	0
Seat change	▼8	▲11	▼3
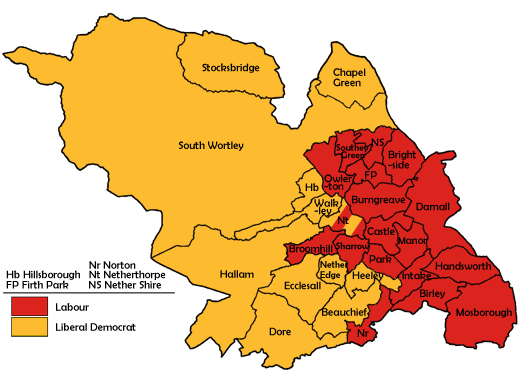
- Map showing the results of the 1994 Sheffield City Council elections.
Majority party before election
Labour Party (UK)
Majority party after election
Labour Party (UK)

Elections to Sheffield City Council were held on 5 May 1994. One third of the council was up for election. Since the previous election, three by-elections had taken place, resulting in two Lib Dem gains from Labour in Brightside and Walkley and a successful hold of a Dore seat by the Conservatives. This, along with a defection from Burngreave councillor James Jamison, left Labour down three, the Liberal Democrats up two and the Conservatives unchanged going into this election.

== Election result ==
Sheffield local election result 1994
Party	Seats	Gains	Losses	Net gain/loss	Seats %	Votes %	Votes	+/−
Liberal Democrats	12	11	0	+11	37.5	42.1	64,208	+14.4
Labour	20	0	8	-8	62.5	41.2	62,741	+3.0
Conservative	0	0	3	-3	0.0	13.3	20,291	-19.1
Green	0	0	0	0	0.0	1.2	1,903	-0.3
Save Our Park and Services	0	0	0	0	0.0	1.1	1,613	N/A
Militant Labour	0	0	0	0	0.0	0.4	682	+0.3
Independent	0	0	0	0	0.0	0.3	505	N/A
Independent Labour	0	0	0	0	0.0	0.3	385	N/A
Communist League	0	0	0	0	0.0	0.0	35	N/A

This result had the following consequences for the total number of seats on the council after the elections:

Party	Previous council	New council
Labour	64	56
Liberal Democrats	11	22
Conservatives	11	8
Independent Labour	1	1
Total	87	87
Working majority	41	25

== Ward results ==
Beauchief
Party	Candidate	Votes	%	±%
Liberal Democrats	Peter Moore*	4,652	64.5	+7.7
Labour	Barry Birks	1,577	21.9	+4.9
Conservative	Michael Young	859	11.9	−14.2
Save Our Park and Services	Violet Needham	120	1.6	+1.6
Majority		3,075	42.6	+11.9
Turnout		7,208	49.3	+3.5
Liberal Democrats hold		Swing	+1.4	

Birley
Party	Candidate	Votes	%	±%
Labour	Donald Gow*	3,039	55.1	+7.0
Liberal Democrats	Louise Truman	1,724	31.3	+14.4
Conservative	Margaret Pigott	749	13.6	−21.3
Majority		1,315	23.8	+10.6
Turnout		5,512	36.1	+9.6
Labour hold		Swing	-3.7	

Brightside
Party	Candidate	Votes	%	±%
Labour	Alfred Meade**	2,076	47.6	−7.6
Liberal Democrats	Joyce Brodie	1,986	45.5	+29.1
Conservative	Michael Quirke	210	4.8	−23.6
Save Our Park and Services	Alan Shipley	90	2.0	+2.0
Majority		90	2.1	−24.7
Turnout		4,362	33.7	+14.5
Labour hold		Swing	-18.3	

Alfred Meade was a sitting councillor for Stocksbridge ward

Broomhill
Party	Candidate	Votes	%	±%
Labour	Richard Eastall*	2,179	38.4	+5.4
Liberal Democrats	Leonard Hesketh	1,809	31.9	+14.9
Conservative	Charles Wallis	1,372	24.2	−18.5
Green	Joseph Otten	191	3.4	−3.7
Save Our Park and Services	Lorette Bilby	120	2.1	+2.1
Majority		370	6.5	−3.2
Turnout		5,671	34.6	+4.1
Labour hold		Swing	-4.7	

Burngreave
Party	Candidate	Votes	%	±%
Labour	John Watson*	1,986	61.1	+0.9
Liberal Democrats	Katherine Milson	630	19.4	+1.5
Independent	Donald Sparkes	345	10.6	+10.6
Conservative	David Knight	251	7.7	−14.1
Communist League	Antony Hunt	35	1.1	+1.1
Majority		1,356	41.7	+3.3
Turnout		3,247	27.9	+7.3
Labour hold		Swing	-0.3	

Castle
Party	Candidate	Votes	%	±%
Labour	Peter Horton*	1,963	67.0	+3.5
Liberal Democrats	Andrew McKerrow	567	19.3	+3.8
Conservative	Anne Smith	270	9.2	−11.8
Green	Graham Wroe	130	4.4	+4.4
Majority		1,396	47.7	+5.2
Turnout		2,930	25.4	+6.2
Labour hold		Swing	-0.1	

Chapel Green
Party	Candidate	Votes	%	±%
Liberal Democrats	Francis Butler	4,529	61.1	+0.2
Labour	Laurence Kingham*	2,489	33.6	+7.0
Conservative	Michael Boot	393	5.3	−7.2
Majority		2,040	27.5	−6.8
Turnout		7,411	40.4	+7.3
Liberal Democrats gain from Labour		Swing	-3.4	

Darnall
Party	Candidate	Votes	%	±%
Labour	Choudry Walayat*	2,110	47.1	−4.3
Liberal Democrats	Theresa Hainey	1,448	32.3	+20.6
Conservative	Laurence Hayward	571	12.7	−16.9
Green	Gordon Ferguson	348	7.8	+0.5
Majority		662	14.8	−7.0
Turnout		4,477	30.3	+8.2
Labour hold		Swing	-12.4	

Dore
Party	Candidate	Votes	%	±%
Liberal Democrats	Colin Ross	3,292	45.1	+27.2
Conservative	John Harthman*	2,627	36.0	−28.8
Labour	Michael King	1,248	17.1	−0.2
Save Our Park and Services	Joyce Baptie	124	1.7	+1.7
Majority		665	9.1	−37.8
Turnout		7,291	45.3	+6.4
Liberal Democrats gain from Conservative		Swing	+28.0	

Ecclesall
Party	Candidate	Votes	%	±%
Liberal Democrats	Roger Davison	3,022	42.2	+20.4
Conservative	Stuart Dawson*	2,433	33.9	−26.0
Labour	Lawrence Samuels	1,334	18.6	+2.8
Save Our Park and Services	Philip Eastwood	375	5.2	+5.2
Majority		589	8.3	−29.8
Turnout		7,164	45.5	+6.7
Liberal Democrats gain from Conservative		Swing	+23.2	

Firth Park
Party	Candidate	Votes	%	±%
Labour	Joan Barton*	2,726	65.4	+2.2
Labour	Alan Law	2,300		
Liberal Democrats	Susan Cutts	1,090	26.1	+16.5
Liberal Democrats	Ruth Dawson	898		
Conservative	Steven Clark	354	8.5	−18.6
Conservative	Fiona Leach	243		
Majority		1,210	39.3	+3.2
Turnout		4,170	28.6	+6.2
Labour hold		Swing		
Labour hold		Swing	-7.1	

Hallam
Party	Candidate	Votes	%	±%
Liberal Democrats	Duncan Kime	3,729	50.4	+25.2
Conservative	Graham Lawson*	2,350	31.7	−24.6
Labour	William Barnard	1,159	15.6	+1.0
Green	Peter Scott	162	2.2	−1.6
Majority		1,379	18.7	−12.4
Turnout		7,400	50.0	+10.3
Liberal Democrats gain from Conservative		Swing	+24.9	

Handsworth
Party	Candidate	Votes	%	±%
Labour	Raymond Satur	2,553	50.0	−0.2
Liberal Democrats	Michael Ogden	2,050	40.1	+20.4
Conservative	Shirley Clayton	501	9.8	−20.2
Majority		503	9.9	−10.3
Turnout		5,104	35.6	+10.9
Labour hold		Swing	-10.3	

Heeley
Party	Candidate	Votes	%	±%
Liberal Democrats	Stephen Ayris	3,282	52.5	+19.8
Labour	Roy Darke*	2,534	40.5	−4.9
Conservative	Francis Woodger	297	4.7	−17.2
Save Our Park and Services	Hilary Pickin	136	2.2	+2.2
Majority		748	12.5	−0.2
Turnout		6,249	43.3	+15.5
Liberal Democrats gain from Labour		Swing	+12.3	

Hillsborough
Party	Candidate	Votes	%	±%
Liberal Democrats	Christine Tosseano	3,179	50.8	+19.8
Labour	Audrey Hilbert	2,300	36.7	+1.2
Conservative	Michael Hayman	659	10.5	−19.1
Save Our Park and Services	Avril Critchley	122	1.9	+1.9
Majority		879	14.1	+9.6
Turnout		6,260	41.8	+9.9
Liberal Democrats gain from Labour		Swing	+9.3	

Intake
Party	Candidate	Votes	%	±%
Labour	Freda White	2,449	45.4	+2.4
Labour	David Lawton	2,428		
Liberal Democrats	Christopher Tutt	2,177	40.4	+22.7
Liberal Democrats	Robert Watson	2,039		
Conservative	Michael Pinder	595	11.0	−28.3
Conservative	Jack Thompson	523		
Save Our Park and Services	Margaret Stuart	171	3.2	+3.2
Majority		272	5.0	+1.3
Turnout		5,392	33.8	+8.3
Labour hold		Swing	-10.1	

Manor
Party	Candidate	Votes	%	±%
Labour	Janet Fiore	1,880	66.7	+5.2
Liberal Democrats	Roy Denton	709	25.2	+8.9
Conservative	Andrew Watson	227	8.0	−14.1
Majority		1,171	41.5	+2.1
Turnout		2,816	30.4	+9.2
Labour hold		Swing	-1.8	

Mosborough
Party	Candidate	Votes	%	±%
Labour	Ian Saunders*	4,144	52.3	+6.6
Liberal Democrats	Alan Hatcher	2,670	33.7	+18.8
Conservative	Thomas Pigott	1,102	13.9	−25.5
Majority		1,474	18.6	+12.3
Turnout		7,916	31.5	+8.4
Labour hold		Swing	-6.1	

Nether Edge
Party	Candidate	Votes	%	±%
Liberal Democrats	Doreen Huddard	2,989	50.0	+1.1
Labour	Qurban Hussain*	2,090	35.0	+4.7
Conservative	Marjorie Kirby	567	9.5	−7.5
Green	R. Southworth	229	3.8	+0.1
Save Our Park and Services	A. Dronfield	99	1.7	+1.7
Majority		899	15.1	−3.5
Turnout		5,974	41.3	+5.8
Liberal Democrats gain from Labour		Swing	-1.8	

Nether Shire
Party	Candidate	Votes	%	±%
Labour	Doreen Newton	2,238	56.0	+4.1
Liberal Democrats	Wayne Morton	1,434	35.9	+10.7
Conservative	E. Platts	328	8.2	−14.6
Majority		804	20.1	−6.6
Turnout		4,000	31.7	+8.8
Labour hold		Swing	-3.3	

Netherthorpe
Party	Candidate	Votes	%	±%
Labour	Michael Bower*	1,849	38.2	−12.2
Liberal Democrats	Sylvia Anginotti	1,624	33.5	+16.7
Liberal Democrats	Howard Middleton	1,561		
Labour	Michael Smith	1,455		
Green	Barry New	477	9.9	−0.7
Independent Labour	P. Wallace	385	8.0	+8.0
Conservative	Maureen Neill	265	5.5	−16.6
Save Our Park and Services	J. Green	156	3.2	+3.2
Independent Labour	P. Hughes	139		
Independent	R. Clare	86	1.8	+1.8
Majority		225	4.7	−23.6
Turnout		4,842	31.8	+10.5
Labour hold		Swing		
Liberal Democrats gain from Labour		Swing	+14.4	

Norton
Party	Candidate	Votes	%	±%
Labour	James Moore*	2,333	46.6	+6.0
Liberal Democrats	B. Noonan	1,954	39.0	+12.5
Conservative	Michael Ginn	723	14.4	−18.4
Majority		379	7.6	−0.2
Turnout		5,010	40.2	+6.2
Labour hold		Swing	-3.2	

Owlerton
Party	Candidate	Votes	%	±%
Labour	George Mathews*	2,166	58.8	+5.1
Liberal Democrats	M. Sloane	1,031	28.0	+12.4
Conservative	Clive Dearden	344	9.3	−19.0
Green	Paul Mitchell	141	3.8	+1.5
Majority		1,135	30.8	+5.4
Turnout		3,682	29.4	+7.5
Labour hold		Swing	-3.6	

Park
Party	Candidate	Votes	%	±%
Labour	Doris Mulhearn*	1,655	50.0	−11.1
Liberal Democrats	Sheila Hughes	706	21.3	+6.7
Militant Labour	Kenneth Douglas	682	20.6	+20.6
Conservative	Paul Anderton	265	8.0	−16.3
Majority		949	28.7	−8.1
Turnout		3,308	26.2	+9.5
Labour hold		Swing	-8.9	

Sharrow
Party	Candidate	Votes	%	±%
Labour	C. McDonald	2,103	55.1	−0.2
Liberal Democrats	Andrew White	1,289	33.8	+13.8
Conservative	Anne Smith	252	6.6	−15.4
Save Our Park and Services	W. Pickin	100	2.6	+2.6
Independent	Simon Rawlins	74	1.9	−0.7
Majority		814	21.3	−12.0
Turnout		3,818	31.4	+9.4
Labour hold		Swing	-7.0	

South Wortley
Party	Candidate	Votes	%	±%
Liberal Democrats	Victoria Bowden	4,645	59.8	+8.3
Labour	John Webster*	2,343	30.2	+6.9
Conservative	Lynn Wilson	783	10.1	−15.0
Majority		2,302	29.6	+3.2
Turnout		7,771	42.3	+7.4
Liberal Democrats gain from Labour		Swing	+0.7	

Southey Green
Party	Candidate	Votes	%	±%
Labour	Patricia Nelson*	2,182	67.4	+0.1
Liberal Democrats	Alison MacFarlane	777	24.0	+10.6
Conservative	David Marriott	278	8.6	−10.7
Majority		1,405	43.4	−4.6
Turnout		3,237	27.7	+6.7
Labour hold		Swing	-5.2	

Stocksbridge
Party	Candidate	Votes	%	±%
Liberal Democrats	David Chadwick	2,283	55.0	+15.7
Labour	Sylvia Parry	1,517	36.5	−0.3
Conservative	I. Marshall	354	8.5	−15.3
Majority		766	18.4	+15.9
Turnout		4,154	39.3	+8.7
Liberal Democrats gain from Labour		Swing	+8.0	

Walkley
Party	Candidate	Votes	%	±%
Liberal Democrats	Andrew Milton	2,931	49.0	+27.1
Labour	James Bamford	2,519	42.1	−1.8
Conservative	Veronica Hague	312	5.2	−24.0
Green	Nicola Watson	225	3.8	−1.1
Majority		412	6.9	−7.8
Turnout		5,987	41.0	+11.8
Liberal Democrats gain from Labour		Swing	+14.4	
