= 1992 Sheffield City Council election =

| ← 1991 | 7 May 1992 | 1994 → |

31 of 87 seats to Sheffield City Council 44 seats needed for a majority
| | First party | Second party | Third party |
|---|---|---|---|
| Party | Labour | Conservative | Liberal Democrats |
| Seats won | 21 | 5 | 5 |
| Seat change | ▼3 | 0 | ▲3 |
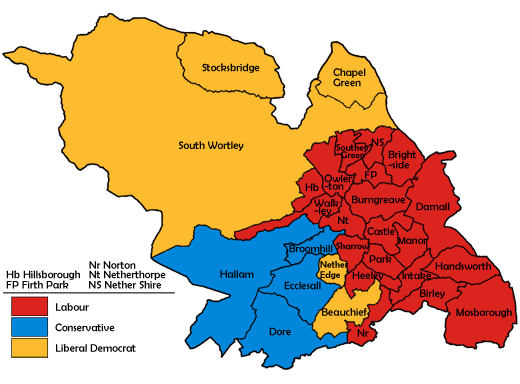
- Map showing the results of the 1992 Sheffield City Council elections.
Majority party before election
Labour Party (UK)
Majority party after election
Labour Party (UK)

Elections to Sheffield City Council were held on 7 May 1992. One third of the council was up for election.

== Election result ==
Sheffield local election result 1992
| Party | Seats | Gains | Losses | Net gain/loss | Seats % | Votes % | Votes | +/− |
|---|---|---|---|---|---|---|---|---|
| Labour | 21 | 0 | 3 | -3 | 67.7 | 38.2 | 45,091 | -11.4 |
| Conservative | 5 | 1 | 1 | 0 | 16.1 | 32.4 | 38,229 | +8.9 |
| Liberal Democrats | 5 | 3 | 0 | +3 | 16.1 | 27.7 | 32,623 | +3.0 |
| Green | 0 | 0 | 0 | 0 | 0.0 | 1.5 | 1,785 | +0.1 |
| Safer Cycling | 0 | 0 | 0 | 0 | 0.0 | 0.1 | 150 | N/A |
| Wealth Redistribution | 0 | 0 | 0 | 0 | 0.0 | 0.1 | 65 | ±0.0 |

This result had the following consequences for the total number of seats on the Council after the elections:

| Party | Previous council | New council |
|---|---|---|
| Labour | 70 | 67 |
| Conservatives | 11 | 11 |
| Liberal Democrats | 6 | 9 |
| Total | 87 | 87 |
| Working majority | 53 | 47 |

== Ward results ==
Beauchief
| Party | Candidate | Votes | % | ±% |
|---|---|---|---|---|
| Liberal Democrats | Roger Hughes | 3,884 | 56.8 | −3.0 |
| Conservative | Francis Woodger | 1,785 | 26.1 | +3.3 |
| Labour | David Lawton | 1,164 | 17.0 | −0.3 |
| Majority | | 2,099 | 30.7 | −6.3 |
| Turnout | | 6,833 | 45.8 | −6.5 |
| Liberal Democrats gain from Conservative | | Swing | -3.1 | |

Birley
| Party | Candidate | Votes | % | ±% |
|---|---|---|---|---|
| Labour | Val Shepherd* | 1,990 | 48.1 | −13.0 |
| Conservative | Margaret Pigott | 1,447 | 34.9 | +13.3 |
| Liberal Democrats | Audrey Ashworth | 701 | 16.9 | −0.4 |
| Majority | | 543 | 13.2 | −26.3 |
| Turnout | | 4,138 | 26.5 | −8.9 |
| Labour hold | | Swing | -13.1 | |

Brightside
| Party | Candidate | Votes | % | ±% |
|---|---|---|---|---|
| Labour | Peter Price* | 1,384 | 55.2 | −13.9 |
| Conservative | Marjorie Kirby | 711 | 28.4 | +12.6 |
| Liberal Democrats | Michael Davis | 411 | 16.4 | +1.3 |
| Majority | | 673 | 26.8 | −26.5 |
| Turnout | | 2,506 | 19.2 | −8.9 |
| Labour hold | | Swing | -13.2 | |

Broomhill
| Party | Candidate | Votes | % | ±% |
|---|---|---|---|---|
| Conservative | John Levick | 2,025 | 42.7 | +3.7 |
| Labour | Robert Quick | 1,563 | 33.0 | −0.4 |
| Liberal Democrats | Allan Wisbey | 808 | 17.0 | −1.9 |
| Green | Michael Baker | 339 | 7.1 | −1.6 |
| Majority | | 462 | 9.7 | +4.1 |
| Turnout | | 4,735 | 30.5 | −3.6 |
| Conservative gain from Labour | | Swing | +2.0 | |

Burngreave
| Party | Candidate | Votes | % | ±% |
|---|---|---|---|---|
| Labour | Phyllis Smith* | 1,501 | 60.2 | −5.4 |
| Conservative | Andrew Cook | 544 | 21.8 | +6.7 |
| Liberal Democrats | Katherine Milsom | 447 | 17.9 | +3.5 |
| Majority | | 957 | 38.4 | −12.1 |
| Turnout | | 2,492 | 20.6 | −8.1 |
| Labour hold | | Swing | -6.0 | |

Castle
| Party | Candidate | Votes | % | ±% |
|---|---|---|---|---|
| Labour | Thomas Bower* | 1,392 | 63.5 | −11.9 |
| Conservative | Anne Smith | 460 | 21.0 | +8.4 |
| Liberal Democrats | Melvin Lockey | 340 | 15.5 | +3.6 |
| Majority | | 938 | 42.5 | −20.3 |
| Turnout | | 2,192 | 19.2 | −10.3 |
| Labour hold | | Swing | -10.1 | |

Chapel Green
| Party | Candidate | Votes | % | ±% |
|---|---|---|---|---|
| Liberal Democrats | Kathleen Chadwick | 3,704 | 60.9 | +5.2 |
| Labour | Eldon Hanson | 1,617 | 26.6 | −10.5 |
| Conservative | Michael Boot | 763 | 12.5 | +5.4 |
| Majority | | 2,087 | 34.3 | +15.7 |
| Turnout | | 6,084 | 33.1 | −7.5 |
| Liberal Democrats hold | | Swing | +7.8 | |

Darnall
| Party | Candidate | Votes | % | ±% |
|---|---|---|---|---|
| Labour | Sandra Robinson* | 1,683 | 51.4 | −5.8 |
| Conservative | Dorothy Kennedy | 968 | 29.6 | +12.4 |
| Liberal Democrats | Motahir Ali | 383 | 11.7 | −1.9 |
| Green | Christine Ferguson | 239 | 7.3 | +0.7 |
| Majority | | 715 | 21.8 | −18.2 |
| Turnout | | 3,273 | 22.1 | −8.7 |
| Labour hold | | Swing | -9.1 | |

Dore
| Party | Candidate | Votes | % | ±% |
|---|---|---|---|---|
| Conservative | David Heslop* | 4,106 | 64.8 | +12.3 |
| Liberal Democrats | Anthony Richmond | 1,134 | 17.9 | −3.1 |
| Labour | Michael King | 1,098 | 17.3 | −9.1 |
| Majority | | 2,972 | 46.9 | +20.8 |
| Turnout | | 6,338 | 38.9 | −5.4 |
| Conservative hold | | Swing | +7.7 | |

Ecclesall
| Party | Candidate | Votes | % | ±% |
|---|---|---|---|---|
| Conservative | Bobbie Fleming* | 3,675 | 59.9 | +14.4 |
| Liberal Democrats | Colin Ross | 1,341 | 21.8 | −1.4 |
| Labour | Timothy Plant | 969 | 15.8 | −5.5 |
| Safer Cycling | Simon Gershon | 150 | 2.4 | +2.4 |
| Majority | | 2,334 | 38.1 | +15.8 |
| Turnout | | 6,135 | 38.8 | −6.7 |
| Conservative hold | | Swing | +7.9 | |

Firth Park
| Party | Candidate | Votes | % | ±% |
|---|---|---|---|---|
| Labour | Marilyn Mitchell | 1,944 | 63.2 | −7.7 |
| Conservative | Raymond Howard | 833 | 27.1 | +15.2 |
| Liberal Democrats | Ali Qadar | 296 | 9.6 | −7.6 |
| Majority | | 1,111 | 36.1 | −17.6 |
| Turnout | | 3,073 | 22.4 | −10.8 |
| Labour hold | | Swing | -11.4 | |

Hallam
| Party | Candidate | Votes | % | ±% |
|---|---|---|---|---|
| Conservative | Peter Jackson* | 3,529 | 56.3 | +3.6 |
| Conservative | Anthony Pratt | 3,389 | | |
| Liberal Democrats | John Knight | 1,581 | 25.2 | +3.1 |
| Liberal Democrats | Roger Davison | 1,376 | | |
| Labour | Mary Balbi | 918 | 14.6 | −6.5 |
| Labour | Richard Roper | 794 | | |
| Green | Peter Scott | 242 | 3.8 | −0.2 |
| Majority | | 1,808 | 31.1 | +0.5 |
| Turnout | | 6,270 | 39.7 | −9.2 |
| Conservative hold | | Swing | | |
| Conservative hold | | Swing | +0.2 | |

Handsworth
| Party | Candidate | Votes | % | ±% |
|---|---|---|---|---|
| Labour | Dennis Metcalfe | 1,809 | 50.2 | −10.8 |
| Conservative | Shirley Clayton | 1,083 | 30.0 | +12.5 |
| Liberal Democrats | Anita Morris | 712 | 19.7 | −1.8 |
| Majority | | 726 | 20.2 | −19.3 |
| Turnout | | 3,604 | 24.7 | −9.0 |
| Labour hold | | Swing | -11.6 | |

Heeley
| Party | Candidate | Votes | % | ±% |
|---|---|---|---|---|
| Labour | David Hayes | 1,876 | 45.4 | −13.4 |
| Liberal Democrats | Stephen Ayris | 1,349 | 32.7 | +11.2 |
| Conservative | Maureen Neill | 904 | 21.9 | +2.2 |
| Majority | | 527 | 12.7 | −24.6 |
| Turnout | | 4,129 | 27.8 | −6.6 |
| Labour hold | | Swing | -12.3 | |

Hillsborough
| Party | Candidate | Votes | % | ±% |
|---|---|---|---|---|
| Labour | Kali Mountford | 1,718 | 35.5 | −14.0 |
| Liberal Democrats | Christine Tosseano | 1,504 | 31.0 | +9.8 |
| Conservative | Thomas Seaton | 1,436 | 29.6 | +6.0 |
| Green | Peter Wood | 185 | 3.8 | −1.8 |
| Majority | | 214 | 4.5 | −21.4 |
| Turnout | | 4,843 | 31.9 | −4.6 |
| Labour hold | | Swing | -11.9 | |

Intake
| Party | Candidate | Votes | % | ±% |
|---|---|---|---|---|
| Labour | Janet Wilson | 1,711 | 43.0 | −13.4 |
| Conservative | Andrew Fitzpatrick | 1,567 | 39.3 | +14.6 |
| Liberal Democrats | Susan Alston | 704 | 17.7 | −1.2 |
| Majority | | 144 | 3.7 | −28.0 |
| Turnout | | 3,982 | 25.5 | −6.2 |
| Labour hold | | Swing | -14.0 | |

Manor
| Party | Candidate | Votes | % | ±% |
|---|---|---|---|---|
| Labour | Kenneth Curran | 1,239 | 61.5 | −12.0 |
| Labour | William Jordan* | 1,238 | | |
| Conservative | Albert Marsden | 446 | 22.1 | +9.4 |
| Conservative | Andrew Watson | 386 | | |
| Liberal Democrats | Stuart Bridge | 328 | 16.3 | +2.6 |
| Liberal Democrats | Margaret Davis | 301 | | |
| Majority | | 792 | 39.4 | −20.4 |
| Turnout | | 2,013 | 21.2 | −11.3 |
| Labour hold | | Swing | | |
| Labour hold | | Swing | -10.7 | |

Mosborough
| Party | Candidate | Votes | % | ±% |
|---|---|---|---|---|
| Labour | Dorothy Walton* | 2,614 | 45.7 | −11.0 |
| Conservative | Thomas Pigott | 2,255 | 39.4 | +12.8 |
| Liberal Democrats | Louise Truman | 851 | 14.9 | −1.7 |
| Majority | | 614 | 6.3 | −23.8 |
| Turnout | | 5,720 | 23.1 | −7.5 |
| Labour hold | | Swing | -11.9 | |

Nether Edge
| Party | Candidate | Votes | % | ±% |
|---|---|---|---|---|
| Liberal Democrats | Gregory Connor | 2,532 | 48.9 | +15.2 |
| Labour | Janet Fiore* | 1,568 | 30.3 | −10.9 |
| Conservative | Qari Siddique | 882 | 17.0 | −8.1 |
| Green | Nicola Watson | 194 | 3.7 | +3.7 |
| Majority | | 964 | 18.6 | +11.1 |
| Turnout | | 5,176 | 35.5 | −0.9 |
| Liberal Democrats gain from Labour | | Swing | +13.0 | |

Nether Shire
| Party | Candidate | Votes | % | ±% |
|---|---|---|---|---|
| Labour | Jane Bird | 1,510 | 51.9 | −17.6 |
| Liberal Democrats | Doreen Huddart | 734 | 25.2 | +8.3 |
| Conservative | Anthony Cherry | 665 | 22.8 | +9.3 |
| Majority | | 776 | 26.7 | −25.9 |
| Turnout | | 2,909 | 22.9 | −8.3 |
| Labour hold | | Swing | -12.9 | |

Netherthorpe
| Party | Candidate | Votes | % | ±% |
|---|---|---|---|---|
| Labour | Anne Phelps | 1,457 | 50.4 | −9.9 |
| Conservative | David Knight | 640 | 22.1 | +7.8 |
| Liberal Democrats | Andrew McKerrow | 486 | 16.8 | +2.2 |
| Green | Barry New | 308 | 10.6 | −0.2 |
| Majority | | 817 | 28.3 | −17.4 |
| Turnout | | 2,891 | 21.3 | −6.1 |
| Labour hold | | Swing | -8.8 | |

Norton
| Party | Candidate | Votes | % | ±% |
|---|---|---|---|---|
| Labour | Edward Lamb** | 1,777 | 40.6 | −14.9 |
| Conservative | Nicola Wilde | 1,433 | 32.8 | +9.3 |
| Liberal Democrats | Christopher Tutt | 1,161 | 26.5 | +5.5 |
| Majority | | 344 | 7.8 | −24.2 |
| Turnout | | 4,371 | 34.0 | −6.1 |
| Labour hold | | Swing | -12.1 | |

Edward Lamb was a sitting councillor for Heeley ward

Owlerton
| Party | Candidate | Votes | % | ±% |
|---|---|---|---|---|
| Labour | David Jones | 1,501 | 53.7 | −13.4 |
| Conservative | Philip Kirby | 791 | 28.3 | +12.6 |
| Liberal Democrats | Kathryn Taylor | 435 | 15.6 | −1.6 |
| Green | Paul Mitchell | 65 | 2.3 | +2.3 |
| Majority | | 710 | 25.4 | −24.5 |
| Turnout | | 2,792 | 21.9 | −9.0 |
| Labour hold | | Swing | -13.0 | |

Park
| Party | Candidate | Votes | % | ±% |
|---|---|---|---|---|
| Labour | Alice Sargent* | 1,369 | 61.1 | −13.8 |
| Conservative | Mary Hyatt | 544 | 24.3 | +13.2 |
| Liberal Democrats | Sheila Hughes | 328 | 14.6 | +0.6 |
| Majority | | 825 | 36.8 | −24.1 |
| Turnout | | 2,241 | 16.7 | −9.8 |
| Labour hold | | Swing | -13.5 | |

Sharrow
| Party | Candidate | Votes | % | ±% |
|---|---|---|---|---|
| Labour | Michael Pye* | 1,363 | 55.3 | −7.6 |
| Conservative | Paul Makin | 542 | 22.0 | +5.3 |
| Liberal Democrats | Andrew White | 493 | 20.0 | +3.0 |
| Wealth Redistribution | Simon Rawlins | 65 | 2.6 | -0.8 |
| Majority | | 821 | 33.3 | −12.6 |
| Turnout | | 2,463 | 22.0 | −5.7 |
| Labour hold | | Swing | -6.4 | |

South Wortley
| Party | Candidate | Votes | % | ±% |
|---|---|---|---|---|
| Liberal Democrats | Arthur Dunworth | 3,376 | 51.5 | +8.1 |
| Conservative | Lynn Wilson | 1,646 | 25.1 | +4.8 |
| Labour | Mark Denton | 1,528 | 23.3 | −13.0 |
| Majority | | 1,730 | 26.4 | +19.3 |
| Turnout | | 6,550 | 34.9 | −6.7 |
| Liberal Democrats hold | | Swing | +1.6 | |

Southey Green
| Party | Candidate | Votes | % | ±% |
|---|---|---|---|---|
| Labour | John Butler** | 1,696 | 67.3 | −10.9 |
| Conservative | Michael Young | 486 | 19.3 | +10.1 |
| Liberal Democrats | Francis Pierce | 339 | 13.4 | +0.9 |
| Majority | | 1,210 | 48.0 | −17.7 |
| Turnout | | 2,521 | 21.0 | −10.4 |
| Labour hold | | Swing | -10.5 | |

John Butler was a sitting councillor for Norton ward

Stocksbridge
| Party | Candidate | Votes | % | ±% |
|---|---|---|---|---|
| Liberal Democrats | Maureen Brelsford | 1,309 | 39.3 | +2.6 |
| Labour | Alan Law* | 1,227 | 36.8 | −11.0 |
| Conservative | Anne Smith | 795 | 23.8 | +8.4 |
| Majority | | 82 | 2.5 | −8.6 |
| Turnout | | 3,331 | 30.6 | −3.4 |
| Liberal Democrats gain from Labour | | Swing | +6.8 | |

Walkley
| Party | Candidate | Votes | % | ±% |
|---|---|---|---|---|
| Labour | Jean Cromar* | 1,905 | 43.9 | −12.0 |
| Conservative | Veronica Hague | 1,268 | 29.2 | +11.3 |
| Liberal Democrats | Paul Blythe | 952 | 21.9 | +3.1 |
| Green | Janette Moon | 213 | 4.9 | −2.4 |
| Majority | | 637 | 14.7 | −22.4 |
| Turnout | | 4,338 | 29.2 | −5.2 |
| Labour hold | | Swing | -11.6 | |

== By-elections between 1992 and 1994 ==
Brightside By-Election 8 October 1992
| Party | Candidate | Votes | % | ±% |
|---|---|---|---|---|
| Liberal Democrats | Gail Smith | 1,330 | 50.6 | +34.2 |
| Labour | Alan Law | 924 | 35.2 | −20.0 |
| Conservative | Marjorie Kirby | 374 | 14.2 | −14.2 |
| Majority | | 406 | 15.4 | −11.4 |
| Turnout | | 2,628 | 20.1 | +0.9 |
| Liberal Democrats gain from Labour | | Swing | +27.1 | |

Dore By-Election 8 October 1992
| Party | Candidate | Votes | % | ±% |
|---|---|---|---|---|
| Conservative | John Harthman | 2,165 | 52.6 | −12.2 |
| Liberal Democrats | Colin Ross | 1,462 | 35.5 | +17.6 |
| Labour | Mike King | 486 | 11.8 | −5.5 |
| Majority | | 703 | 17.1 | −29.8 |
| Turnout | | 4,113 | 25.2 | −13.7 |
| Conservative hold | | Swing | -14.9 | |

Walkley By-Election 26 November 1992
| Party | Candidate | Votes | % | ±% |
|---|---|---|---|---|
| Liberal Democrats | Diane Leek | 1,529 | 42.0 | +20.1 |
| Labour | Jim Bamford | 1,345 | 37.0 | −6.9 |
| Conservative | Veronica Hague | 594 | 16.3 | −12.9 |
| Green | Nicola Watson | 170 | 4.7 | −0.2 |
| Majority | | 184 | 5.1 | −9.6 |
| Turnout | | 3,638 | 24.5 | −4.7 |
| Liberal Democrats gain from Labour | | Swing | +13.5 | |

Walkley By-Election 14 January 1993
| Party | Candidate | Votes | % | ±% |
|---|---|---|---|---|
| Liberal Democrats | Diane Leek | 2,526 | 58.5 | +16.5 |
| Labour | Jim Bamford | 1,434 | 33.2 | −3.8 |
| Conservative | Veronica Hague | 262 | 6.1 | −10.2 |
| Green | Nicola Watson | 170 | 1.9 | −2.8 |
| Revolutionary Communist | Colin O'Malley | 18 | 0.4 | +0.4 |
| Majority | | 1,092 | 25.3 | +20.1 |
| Turnout | | 4,321 | 29.1 | +4.6 |
| Liberal Democrats hold | | Swing | +10.1 | |
