= 1972 Sheffield City Council election =

← 1971	May 1972	1973 →

28 councillors to Sheffield City Council
	First party	Second party	Third party
Party	Labour	Conservative	Liberal
Seats won	21	6	1
Seat change	▲4	▼4	0
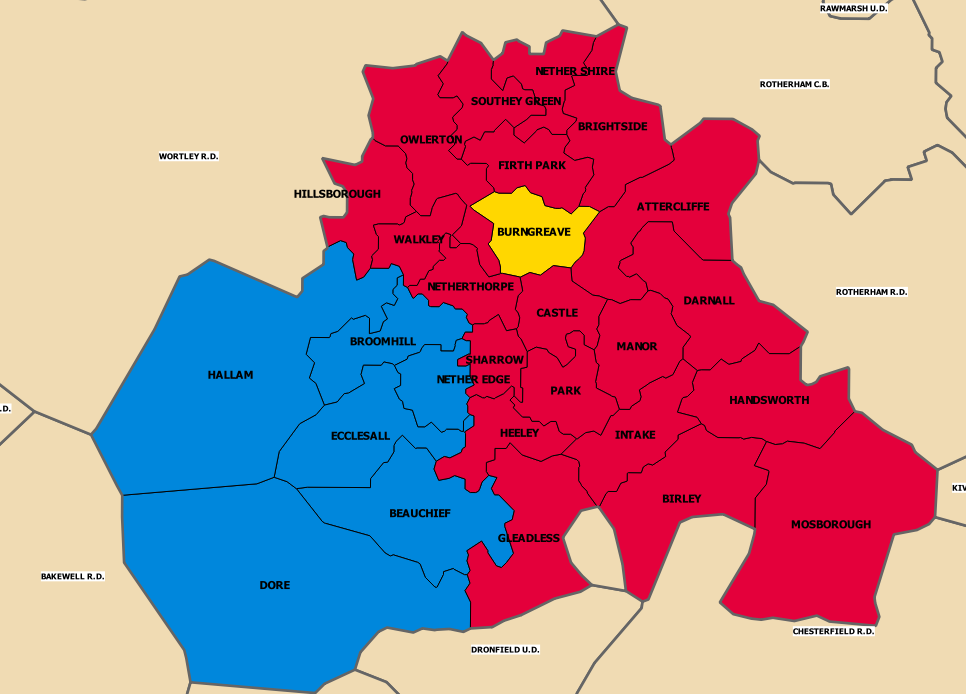
- Map showing the results of the election in each ward. Colours denote the winning party as shown in the main table of results.
Majority party before election
Labour Party (UK)
Majority party after election
Labour Party (UK)

The final Municipal elections for Sheffield - soon to be abolished by the Local Government Act 1972 - were held in May 1972, with one third up for vote, as well as an extra vacancy in Brightside.

The election seen Labour further their stranglehold on the council with four gains from the Conservatives, as they repeated the previous year's wins. One of the notable casualties from last year, Irvine Patnick, managed re-election via re-location to the safe Conservative ward of Broomhill. The Liberals, standing the lowest number of candidates (3) in over a decade, were rewarded for focusing their efforts on retaining their sole representation on the council, as they easily defended their by-election-won seat of Burngreave, more than sextupling their majority there. Labour were reported to be overjoyed to see the return of former councillor, and veteran of the party, Joe Albaya in Intake, after over a decade's absence.

== Election result ==
Sheffield local election result 1972
Party	Seats	Gains	Losses	Net gain/loss	Seats %	Votes %	Votes	+/−
Labour	21	4	0	+4	75.0	56.4	63,440	-5.3
Conservative	6	0	4	-4	21.4	37.2	41,831	+4.4
Liberal	1	0	0	0	3.6	4.3	4,870	+0.2
Communist	0	0	0	0	0.0	0.9	1,082	+0.1
Ratepayers	0	0	0	0	0.0	0.9	986	+0.9
Independent Ex-Service	0	0	0	0	0.0	0.2	220	0.0

The result had the following consequences for the total number of seats on the Council after the elections:

Party	Previous council		New council	
Party	Cllr	Ald	Cllr	Ald
Labour	57	23	61	23
Conservatives	23	4	19	4
Liberals	1	0	1	0
Communists	0	0	0	0
Ratepayers	0	0	0	0
Independent Ex-Service	0	0	0	0
Total	81	27	81	27
Total	108		108	
Working majority	33	19	41	19
Working majority	52		60	

== Ward results ==
Attercliffe
Party	Candidate	Votes	%	±%
Labour	Norman Eldred	1,720	81.3	−6.4
Conservative	Joan Willows	395	18.7	+6.4
Majority		1,325	62.6	−12.8
Turnout		2,115		
Labour hold		Swing	-6.4	

Beauchief
Party	Candidate	Votes	%	±%
Conservative	Charles Davison	4,339	75.4	+3.6
Labour	Alec Waugh	1,414	24.6	−3.6
Majority		2,925	50.8	+7.1
Turnout		5,753		
Conservative hold		Swing	+3.6	

Birley
Party	Candidate	Votes	%	±%
Labour	John Yeardley	3,308	68.1	−3.1
Conservative	Gordon Millward	1,547	31.8	+3.1
Majority		1,761	36.3	−6.3
Turnout		4,855		
Labour hold		Swing	-3.1	

Brightside
Party	Candidate	Votes	%	±%
Labour	Bill Michie	2,288	81.5	−1.5
Labour	Peter Price	2,235		
Conservative	Herbert Sellers	395	14.1	−1.0
Communist	Reg Arundel	125	4.4	+2.5
Majority		1,893	67.4	−0.5
Turnout		2,808		
Labour hold		Swing		
Labour hold		Swing	-0.2	

Broomhill
Party	Candidate	Votes	%	±%
Conservative	Irvine Patnick	2,994	61.7	+4.4
Labour	Peter Cave	1,860	38.3	+4.4
Majority		1,134	23.4	0.0
Turnout		4,854		
Conservative hold		Swing	-0.0	

Burngreave
Party	Candidate	Votes	%	±%
Liberal	Francis Butler	3,850	67.4	+28.0
Labour	Ted Fisher	1,802	31.6	−11.9
Communist	Martin Heywood	56	1.0	+0.1
Majority		1,802	35.9	+31.8
Turnout		5,708		
Liberal hold		Swing	+20.0	

Castle
Party	Candidate	Votes	%	±%
Labour	Peter Horton	2,262	81.1	−2.9
Conservative	David Chapman	449	16.1	+16.1
Communist	Violet Gill	78	2.8	−1.5
Majority		1,813	65.0	−7.2
Turnout		2,789		
Labour hold		Swing	-9.5	

Darnall
Party	Candidate	Votes	%	±%
Labour	Frank Prince	3,247	74.2	−5.4
Conservative	Michael Heath	1,129	25.8	+5.4
Majority		2,118	48.4	−10.8
Turnout		4,376		
Labour hold		Swing	-5.4	

Dore
Party	Candidate	Votes	%	±%
Conservative	Thornton Lambert	3,792	72.4	+9.0
Labour	Edmund Ferrett	1,448	27.6	−2.8
Majority		2,344	44.8	+11.8
Turnout		5,240		
Conservative hold		Swing	+5.9	

Ecclesall
Party	Candidate	Votes	%	±%
Conservative	Agnes Edeson	3,559	74.7	+3.8
Labour	Leon Harris	982	20.6	−4.0
Independent Ex-Service	Geoffrey Widdison	220	4.7	+0.3
Majority		2,577	54.1	+7.9
Turnout		4,761		
Conservative hold		Swing	+3.9	

Firth Park
Party	Candidate	Votes	%	±%
Labour	Albert Morris	2,742	74.2	+3.7
Conservative	Danny George	838	22.7	−0.9
Communist	Barry Bracken	116	3.1	+1.2
Majority		1,904	51.5	+4.6
Turnout		3,696		
Labour hold		Swing	+2.3	

Gleadless
Party	Candidate	Votes	%	±%
Labour	Joe Thomas	3,888	57.3	−2.5
Conservative	David Heslop	2,890	42.6	+6.5
Majority		998	14.7	−9.0
Turnout		6,778		
Labour gain from Conservative		Swing	-4.5	

Hallam
Party	Candidate	Votes	%	±%
Conservative	Gordon Wragg	3,611	68.7	+10.4
Labour	Peter Bulger	1,643	31.3	−1.9
Majority		1,968	37.4	+12.3
Turnout		5,254		
Conservative hold		Swing	+6.1	

Handsworth
Party	Candidate	Votes	%	±%
Labour	George Nicholls	2,530	64.8	−13.9
Conservative	Frank Brookes	877	22.5	+1.2
Ratepayers	Peter Jones	496	12.7	+12.7
Majority		1,653	42.3	−15.0
Turnout		3,903		
Labour hold		Swing	-7.5	

Heeley
Party	Candidate	Votes	%	±%
Labour	John Senior	3,318	54.2	−6.5
Conservative	Peter Earl	2,153	35.2	+2.8
Liberal	Bob Jackson	520	8.5	+4.2
Communist	Martin Ashworth	128	2.1	−0.5
Majority		1,165	19.0	−9.3
Turnout		6,119		
Labour gain from Conservative		Swing	-4.6	

Hillsborough
Party	Candidate	Votes	%	±%
Labour	Geoffrey Fairbrother	2,752	50.4	−2.6
Conservative	Constance Dodson	2,702	49.5	+7.2
Majority		50	0.9	−9.8
Turnout		5,454		
Labour gain from Conservative		Swing	-4.9	

Intake
Party	Candidate	Votes	%	±%
Labour	Joe Albaya	2,830	56.8	−9.9
Conservative	Marvyn Moore	1,652	33.1	+5.0
Liberal	David Winn	500	10.0	+4.9
Majority		1,178	23.6	−15.0
Turnout		4,982		
Labour gain from Conservative		Swing	-7.4	

Manor
Party	Candidate	Votes	%	±%
Labour	Dora Fitter	2,493	83.8	−1.6
Conservative	Peter Huddart	360	12.1	+1.7
Communist	John Hukin	120	4.0	−0.1
Majority		2,133	71.7	−3.3
Turnout		2,973		
Labour hold		Swing	-1.6	

Mosborough
Party	Candidate	Votes	%	±%
Labour	Mary Foulds	1,860	66.7	−14.4
Ratepayers	Harold Doxey	490	17.5	+17.5
Conservative	Eric Vawser	440	15.8	−3.1
Majority		1,370	50.9	−11.2
Turnout		2,790		
Labour hold		Swing	-15.9	

Nether Edge
Party	Candidate	Votes	%	±%
Conservative	Ivan Harrington	2,761	68.1	+3.3
Labour	Malcolm Leary	1,290	31.8	−3.3
Majority		1,471	36.3	+6.7
Turnout		4,051		
Conservative hold		Swing	+3.3	

Nether Shire
Party	Candidate	Votes	%	±%
Labour	Philip Moscrop	2,676	78.3	−2.5
Conservative	Bryan Dick	579	16.9	+1.6
Communist	Kenneth Hattersley	162	4.7	+0.9
Majority		2,097	61.4	−4.2
Turnout		3,417		
Labour hold		Swing	-2.0	

Netherthorpe
Party	Candidate	Votes	%	±%
Labour	Doris Mulhearn	2,281	74.9	+0.9
Conservative	Jean Grindrod	675	22.1	−2.0
Communist	Margaret Brown	90	2.9	+1.1
Majority		1,606	52.7	+2.9
Turnout		3,046		
Labour hold		Swing	+1.4	

Owlerton
Party	Candidate	Votes	%	±%
Labour	Jack Watson	2,787	82.5	+0.9
Conservative	Patrick Fenoughty	591	17.5	−0.9
Majority		2,196	65.0	+1.8
Turnout		3,378		
Labour hold		Swing	+0.9	

Park
Party	Candidate	Votes	%	±%
Labour	Samuel Wall	2,898	82.5	−4.2
Conservative	Jack Osborne	476	13.5	+2.8
Communist	George Matthews	137	3.9	+1.3
Majority		2,422	69.0	−7.0
Turnout		3,511		
Labour hold		Swing	-3.5	

Sharrow
Party	Candidate	Votes	%	±%
Labour	Ethel Evans	2,537	71.7	+1.1
Conservative	Colin Barnsley	1,003	28.3	+3.0
Majority		1,534	43.3	−2.0
Turnout		3,540		
Labour hold		Swing	-0.9	

Southey Green
Party	Candidate	Votes	%	±%
Labour	Dorothy Podlesny	2,440	86.0	−1.4
Conservative	Anne Roebuck	326	11.5	+1.4
Communist	George James	70	2.5	−0.1
Majority		2,114	74.5	−2.8
Turnout		2,836		
Labour hold		Swing	-1.4	

Walkley
Party	Candidate	Votes	%	±%
Labour	Bernard Kidd	2,144	62.3	−5.9
Conservative	Stanley Parnell	1,298	37.7	+5.9
Majority		846	24.6	−11.9
Turnout		3,442		
Labour hold		Swing	-5.9	
