= 1973 Sheffield City Council election =

← 1972	10 May 1973	1975 →

All 90 seats to Sheffield City Council 46 seats needed for a majority
	First party	Second party	Third party
Party	Labour	Conservative	Liberal
Seats won	69	18	3
Seat change	0	0	0
Majority party before election
Labour Party (UK)
Majority party after election
Labour Party (UK)

Elections to Sheffield City Council were held on 10 May 1973.

The first elections to the newly created metropolitan borough council were held on 10 May 1973, with the entirety of the 90 seat council - three seats for each of the thirty wards - up for vote. The Local Government Act 1972 stipulated that the elected members were to shadow and eventually take over from the predecessor corporation on 1 April 1974. The order in which the councillors were elected dictated their term serving, with third-place candidates serving two years and up for re-election in 1975, second-placed three years expiring in 1976 and 1st-placed five years until 1978.

== Election result ==
Sheffield local election result 1973
Party	Seats	Gains	Losses	Net gain/loss	Seats %	Votes %	Votes	+/−
Labour	69	0	0	0	76.6	54.9	67,886	N/A
Conservative	18	0	0	0	20.0	28.7	35,479	N/A
Liberal	3	0	0	0	3.3	12.6	15,556	N/A
Independent	0	0	0	0	0.0	2.5	3,117	N/A
Communist	0	0	0	0	0.0	1.3	1,597	N/A

This result had the following consequences for the total number of seats on the Council after the elections:

Party	New council
Labour	69
Conservatives	18
Liberals	3
Communist	0
Total	90
Working majority	48

== Ward results ==
Attercliffe
Party	Candidate	Votes	%	±%
Labour	Harry Firth	1,659	84.9	N/A
Labour	Norman Eldred	1,653		
Labour	Jim Pearson	1,553		
Conservative	Hedley Oldfield	295	15.1	N/A
Conservative	Derek Eastwood	287		
Conservative	Patricia Oldfield	272		
Majority		1,258	69.8	N/A
Turnout		1,954	21.2	N/A
Labour win (new seat)				
Labour win (new seat)				
Labour win (new seat)				

Beauchief
Party	Candidate	Votes	%	±%
Conservative	Eric Crewe	3,165	53.9	N/A
Conservative	Danny George	3,139		
Conservative	Cliff Godber	3,078		
Liberal	Royden Fairfax	1,556	26.5	N/A
Liberal	Jennifer Norris	1,330		
Liberal	Rita Gurson	1,272		
Labour	Peter Cave	1,149	19.6	N/A
Labour	Pat Waugh	1,103		
Labour	Jock Sturrock	1,087		
Majority		1,522	27.4	N/A
Turnout		5,870	38.2	N/A
Conservative win (new seat)				
Conservative win (new seat)				
Conservative win (new seat)				

Birley
Party	Candidate	Votes	%	±%
Labour	John G Marshall	3,005	71.1	N/A
Labour	Tom Ratcliffe	2,947		
Labour	George Fisher	2,929		
Conservative	Gordon Millward	1,219	28.8	N/A
Conservative	William Betts	1,153		
Conservative	Moira Disney	1,138		
Majority		1,710	42.3	N/A
Turnout		4,224	26.3	N/A
Labour win (new seat)				
Labour win (new seat)				
Labour win (new seat)				

Brightside
Party	Candidate	Votes	%	±%
Labour	Bill Michie	2,339	83.4	N/A
Labour	George Wilson	2,311		
Labour	Peter Price	2,310		
Conservative	Nesta Bennett	367	13.1	N/A
Conservative	Julian Birch	367		
Conservative	Paul Mort	265		
Communist	Reg Arundel	98	3.5	N/A
Majority		1,943	70.3	N/A
Turnout		2,804	22.1	N/A
Labour win (new seat)				
Labour win (new seat)				
Labour win (new seat)				

Broomhill
Party	Candidate	Votes	%	±%
Conservative	Graham Cheetham	2,184	46.8	N/A
Conservative	Irvine Patnick	2,179		
Conservative	Marvyn Moore	2,150		
Liberal	John Isard	1,285	27.5	N/A
Liberal	Keith Jackson	1,282		
Liberal	Dennis Tester	1,247		
Labour	David Brown	1,193	25.6	N/A
Labour	John Halstead	1,187		
Labour	Pauline Harrison	1,177		
Majority		865	19.3	N/A
Turnout		4,662	27.4	N/A
Conservative win (new seat)				
Conservative win (new seat)				
Conservative win (new seat)				

Burngreave
Party	Candidate	Votes	%	±%
Liberal	Francis Butler	3,366	63.5	N/A
Liberal	Malcolm Johnson	2,884		
Liberal	Don Sparkes	2,840		
Labour	Charlotte Ellis	1,688	31.8	N/A
Labour	Alan Billings	1,571		
Labour	Bill Robins	1,516		
Conservative	David Chapman	246	4.6	N/A
Conservative	George Dodson	186		
Conservative	Chris Verheart	113		
Majority		1,152	31.7	N/A
Turnout		5,300	42.4	N/A
Liberal win (new seat)				
Liberal win (new seat)				
Liberal win (new seat)				

Castle
Party	Candidate	Votes	%	±%
Labour	Reg Munn	1,978	79.4	N/A
Labour	Peter Horton	1,957		
Labour	Roy Munn	1,920		
Conservative	Margaret Beatson	394	15.8	N/A
Conservative	Emma Sizer	380		
Conservative	Ian Beatson	374		
Communist	Violet Gill	118	4.7	N/A
Majority		1,526	63.6	N/A
Turnout		2,490	20.7	N/A
Labour win (new seat)				
Labour win (new seat)				
Labour win (new seat)				

Chapel Green
Party	Candidate	Votes	%	±%
Labour	Tom Steel	2,322	37.6	N/A
Labour	Arthur Bradbury	2,079		
Labour	Lawrence Kingham	1,961		
Independent	Richard Endall	1,866	30.2	N/A
Liberal	Betty Burton	1,720	27.9	N/A
Independent	Eric Wadsworth	1,549		
Communist	Robert McAteer	262	4.2	N/A
Majority		95	6.0	N/A
Turnout		7,719	60.3	N/A
Labour win (new seat)				
Labour win (new seat)				
Labour win (new seat)				

Darnall
Party	Candidate	Votes	%	±%
Labour	Frank Prince	2,682	77.1	N/A
Labour	Sidney Dyson	2,643		
Labour	Isidore Lewis	2,580		
Conservative	Kathleen Circuit	796	22.9	N/A
Conservative	Dorothy Rose	748		
Conservative	Margaret Broomhead	711		
Majority		1,784	54.2	N/A
Turnout		3,478	24.2	N/A
Labour win (new seat)				
Labour win (new seat)				
Labour win (new seat)				

Dore
Party	Candidate	Votes	%	±%
Conservative	Harold Hebblethwaite	3,247	69.7	N/A
Conservative	David Heslop	3,175		
Conservative	Pat Santhouse	3,167		
Labour	Kenneth Davies	1,411	30.3	N/A
Labour	Win Francis	1,386		
Labour	Robert Jones	1,361		
Majority		1,756	39.4	N/A
Turnout		4,658	32.0	N/A
Conservative win (new seat)				
Conservative win (new seat)				
Conservative win (new seat)				

Ecclesall
Party	Candidate	Votes	%	±%
Conservative	David Pinder	3,194	73.2	N/A
Conservative	John Neill	3,109		
Conservative	Agnes Edeson	3,027		
Labour	Elizabeth Callister	1,169	26.8	N/A
Labour	Elsie Richardson	1,145		
Labour	Norman Mosforth	1,110		
Majority		1,868	46.4	N/A
Turnout		4,363	28.2	N/A
Conservative win (new seat)				
Conservative win (new seat)				
Conservative win (new seat)				

Firth Park
Party	Candidate	Votes	%	±%
Labour	Albert Morris	2,404	56.0	N/A
Labour	Valerie Potts	2,399		
Labour	Terry Butler	2,392		
Liberal	John Butler	1,371	32.0	N/A
Liberal	Albert Hattersley	1,150		
Liberal	Brian Hepworth	1,083		
Conservative	Geoffrey Ward	424	9.9	N/A
Conservative	Bryan Dick	419		
Conservative	Anthony Williams	401		
Communist	Barry Bracken	91	2.1	N/A
Majority		1,021	24.1	N/A
Turnout		4,289	29.0	N/A
Labour win (new seat)				
Labour win (new seat)				
Labour win (new seat)				

Gleadless
Party	Candidate	Votes	%	±%
Labour	Albert Richardson	3,177	61.5	N/A
Labour	Jack Green	3,148		
Labour	Joe Thomas	3,143		
Conservative	Jack Thompson	1,983	38.4	N/A
Conservative	Mary Davison	1,917		
Conservative	Stuart Dawson	1,898		
Majority		1,160	23.1	N/A
Turnout		5,160	29.6	N/A
Labour win (new seat)				
Labour win (new seat)				
Labour win (new seat)				

Hallam
Party	Candidate	Votes	%	±%
Conservative	Peter Jackson	2,540	51.1	N/A
Conservative	Gordon Wragg	2,457		
Conservative	Kenneth Arnold	2,454		
Labour	Dennis Brown	1,376	27.7	N/A
Labour	Peter Bulger	1,318		
Labour	Veronica South	1,292		
Liberal	Jean Mason	1,052	21.2	N/A
Liberal	Lawton Tonge	1,003		
Liberal	Paul Metcalfe	931		
Majority		1,078	23.4	N/A
Turnout		4,968	32.1	N/A
Conservative win (new seat)				
Conservative win (new seat)				
Conservative win (new seat)				

Handsworth
Party	Candidate	Votes	%	±%
Labour	George Nicholls	2,665	76.2	N/A
Labour	Leonard Cope	2,660		
Labour	Annie Britton	2,632		
Conservative	Christine Selby	830	23.7	N/A
Conservative	Alfred Grimes	828		
Conservative	Roger Attwood	805		
Majority		1,802	52.5	N/A
Turnout		3,495	24.6	N/A
Labour win (new seat)				
Labour win (new seat)				
Labour win (new seat)				

Heeley
Party	Candidate	Votes	%	±%
Labour	Mick Batty	3,061	60.9	N/A
Labour	Winifred Golding	2,939		
Labour	John Senior	2,923		
Conservative	Phillip Baker	1,217	24.2	N/A
Conservative	Richard Clarke	1,167		
Conservative	Joyce Palmer	1,125		
Liberal	Bob Jackson	572	11.4	N/A
Communist	Martin Ashworth	173	3.4	N/A
Majority		1,756	36.7	N/A
Turnout		5,023	31.6	N/A
Labour win (new seat)				
Labour win (new seat)				
Labour win (new seat)				

Hillsborough
Party	Candidate	Votes	%	±%
Labour	Alf Meade	2,977	58.3	N/A
Labour	Bill Meade	2,963		
Labour	Geoff Fairbrother	2,943		
Conservative	Frank Adams	2,126	41.6	N/A
Conservative	Kathleene Moore	2,028		
Conservative	Frank Brookes	2,019		
Majority		817	16.7	N/A
Turnout		5,103	35.0	N/A
Labour win (new seat)				
Labour win (new seat)				
Labour win (new seat)				

Intake
Party	Candidate	Votes	%	±%
Labour	Joe Albaya	2,607	59.7	N/A
Labour	Arnold Wood	2,584		
Labour	Tom Woodhead	2,349		
Conservative	Joan Ward	1,009	23.1	N/A
Conservative	Arthur Egginton	972		
Conservative	Andrew Bannister	954		
Liberal	David Winn	749	17.1	N/A
Majority		1,377	36.6	N/A
Turnout		4,365	26.9	N/A
Labour win (new seat)				
Labour win (new seat)				
Labour win (new seat)				

Manor
Party	Candidate	Votes	%	±%
Labour	George Armitage	2,727	84.4	N/A
Labour	Dora Fitter	2,700		
Labour	Marie Rodgers	2,566		
Conservative	Pat Barnsley	331	10.2	N/A
Conservative	Katherine Pinder	330		
Conservative	Roger Barnsley	312		
Communist	John Hukin	172	5.3	N/A
Majority		2,235	44.0	N/A
Turnout		3,908	26.5	N/A
Labour win (new seat)				
Labour win (new seat)				
Labour win (new seat)				

Mosborough
Party	Candidate	Votes	%	±%
Labour	Dorothy Walton	1,895	77.9	N/A
Labour	Mary Anne Foulds	1,890		
Labour	Harry Havenhand	1,869		
Conservative	Edley Keeton	539	22.1	N/A
Conservative	Anne Keeton	503		
Majority		1,332	55.8	N/A
Turnout		2,432	25.7	N/A
Labour win (new seat)				
Labour win (new seat)				
Labour win (new seat)				

Nether Edge
Party	Candidate	Votes	%	±%
Conservative	Peter Earl	1,938	49.4	N/A
Conservative	Jean Grindrod	1,933		
Conservative	Connie Dodson	1,916		
Labour	Leon Harris	1,179	30.0	N/A
Labour	Daphne Billings	1,176		
Labour	Malcolm Leary	1,149		
Liberal	Peter Metcalfe	804	20.5	N/A
Liberal	Harry Hebden	790		
Liberal	Colin Wood	781		
Majority		737	19.4	N/A
Turnout		3,921	26.4	N/A
Conservative win (new seat)				
Conservative win (new seat)				
Conservative win (new seat)				

Nether Shire
Party	Candidate	Votes	%	±%
Labour	Roger Barton	2,784	78.4	N/A
Labour	William Eddison	2,759		
Labour	Philip Moscrop	2,665		
Conservative	Anne Roebuck	557	15.7	N/A
Conservative	Neil Hebblethwaite	547		
Conservative	Evelyn Webster	514		
Communist	Ken Hattersley	208	5.8	N/A
Majority		2,108	62.7	N/A
Turnout		3,549	27.9	N/A
Labour win (new seat)				
Labour win (new seat)				
Labour win (new seat)				

Netherthorpe
Party	Candidate	Votes	%	±%
Labour	Harold Lambert	2,323	71.3	N/A
Labour	Doris Mulhearn	2,229		
Labour	Enid Hattersley	2,106		
Conservative	Moira Hattersley	810	24.8	N/A
Conservative	Maisie Hyatt	649		
Conservative	Merelina Fox	640		
Communist	Margaret Brown	124	3.8	N/A
Majority		1,296	46.5	N/A
Turnout		3,257	27.8	N/A
Labour win (new seat)				
Labour win (new seat)				
Labour win (new seat)				

Owlerton
Party	Candidate	Votes	%	±%
Labour	Jack Watson	2,692	83.9	N/A
Labour	Mary Kirk	2,681		
Labour	Harry Hanwell	2,619		
Conservative	Heather McKenzie	515	16.0	N/A
Conservative	Kevin Moore	477		
Conservative	Stuart Mottershaw	462		
Majority		2,104	67.9	N/A
Turnout		3,207	22.2	N/A
Labour win (new seat)				
Labour win (new seat)				
Labour win (new seat)				

Park
Party	Candidate	Votes	%	±%
Labour	Peter Jones	3,052	81.9	N/A
Labour	Sam Wall	2,968		
Labour	Phillip Grisdale	2,875		
Conservative	Nick Hutton	426	11.4	N/A
Conservative	Fred Barnsley	414		
Conservative	Denise Barnsley	381		
Communist	Roy Makin	249	6.7	N/A
Majority		2,449	70.5	N/A
Turnout		3,727	21.6	N/A
Labour win (new seat)				
Labour win (new seat)				
Labour win (new seat)				

Sharrow
Party	Candidate	Votes	%	±%
Labour	Ethal Evans	2,346	73.2	N/A
Labour	Ian Baxter	2,281		
Labour	Alf Wood	2,228		
Conservative	Deryck Beardshaw	856	26.7	N/A
Conservative	Kathryn Barnsley	851		
Conservative	Colin Barnsley	834		
Majority		1,372	46.5	N/A
Turnout		3,202	27.0	N/A
Labour win (new seat)				
Labour win (new seat)				
Labour win (new seat)				

South Wortley
Party	Candidate	Votes	%	±%
Labour	E. Wingfield	2,977	39.6	N/A
Labour	E. Ratcliffe	2,792		
Labour	John Laurent	2,698		
Conservative	A. Nicholls	1,731	23.0	N/A
Conservative	Richard Saddington	1,552		
Liberal	D. Stuart	1,552	20.7	N/A
Independent	J. Goddard	1,251	16.7	N/A
Conservative	A. Hardy	1,030		
Independent	A. Crapper	705		
Majority		967	19.9	N/A
Turnout		6,260	41.2	N/A
Labour win (new seat)				
Labour win (new seat)				
Labour win (new seat)				

Southey Green
Party	Candidate	Votes	%	±%
Labour	David Blunkett	2,767	87.3	N/A
Labour	Derek Hickin	2,673		
Labour	Dorothy Podlesny	2,661		
Conservative	John Chapman	301	9.5	N/A
Conservative	Ken Platts	301		
Conservative	Jennifer Chapman	298		
Communist	George James	102	3.2	N/A
Majority		2,360	77.8	N/A
Turnout		3,170	22.5	N/A
Labour win (new seat)				
Labour win (new seat)				
Labour win (new seat)				

Stocksbridge
Party	Candidate	Votes	%	±%
Labour	Anthony Sweeney	2,146	41.8	N/A
Labour	Roy Couldwell	1,801		
Labour	Paul Wood	1,783		
Liberal	Albert Leather	1,529	29.8	N/A
Conservative	Margaret Balfour	1,453	28.3	N/A
Conservative	Derek Webster	1,213		
Majority		254	12.0	N/A
Turnout		5,128	51.4	N/A
Labour win (new seat)				
Labour win (new seat)				
Labour win (new seat)				

Walkley
Party	Candidate	Votes	%	±%
Labour	Veronica Hardstaff	2,136	73.1	N/A
Labour	Bernard Kidd	2,072		
Labour	Bill Owen	2,053		
Conservative	Ivy Parnell	786	26.9	N/A
Conservative	Stanley Parnell	769		
Conservative	Christine Crewe	766		
Majority		1,267	46.2	N/A
Turnout		2,922	24.8	N/A
Labour win (new seat)				
Labour win (new seat)				
Labour win (new seat)				
