= 1971 Sheffield City Council election =

← 1970	14 May 1971	1972 →

27 councillors to Sheffield City Council
	First party	Second party	Third party
Party	Labour	Conservative	Liberal
Seats won	21	6	0
Seat change	▲13	▼12	▼1
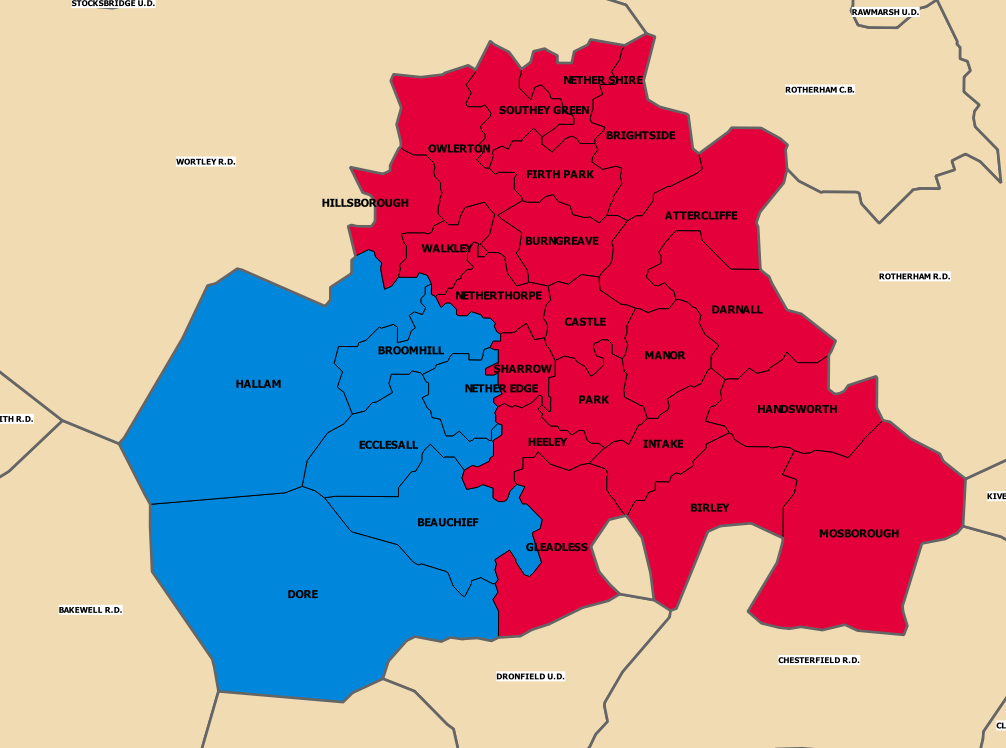
Majority party before election
Labour Party (UK)
Majority party after election
Labour Party (UK)

The 1971 Sheffield City Council elections were held on 14 May 1971, with one third up for vote. Since the previous election, a by-election in November for Burngreave seen the Liberals increase their representation to two, with a gain from Labour.

Immediately following last year's election, the allocation of fourteen retiring Alderman was decided, with Labour taking the overwhelming majority, strengthened by their election performance and the knowledge that if repeated it would lead to a landslide victory for them.

Labour leader Ironmongers' prediction of an aforementioned landslide played out in this election, with Labour making over a dozen gains, with all-but-one coming from their competitor the Conservatives - the other being a Liberal seat in Heeley won in a by-election in 1969. This left them with a record number of 80 seats, and a similarly record-breaking majority of 52.

With such heavy losses, numerous high-profile Conservative councillors lost their seat, not least of which was a contender for the group's leadership, Irvine Patnick.

== Election result ==
Sheffield local election result 1971
Party	Seats	Gains	Losses	Net gain/loss	Seats %	Votes %	Votes	+/−
Labour	21	13	0	+13	77.8	61.7	79,878	+8.8
Conservative	6	0	12	-12	22.2	32.8	42,528	-11.5
Liberal	0	0	1	-1	0.0	4.1	5,351	+2.1
Communist	0	0	0	0	0.0	0.8	1,109	+0.2
Independent Labour	0	0	0	0	0.0	0.3	433	+0.3
Independent Ex-Service	0	0	0	0	0.0	0.2	220	+0.2

The result had the following consequences for the total number of seats on the Council after the elections:

Party	Previous council		New council	
Party	Cllr	Ald	Cllr	Ald
Labour	44	18	57	23
Conservatives	35	9	23	4
Liberals	2	0	1	0
Communists	0	0	0	0
Independent Labour	0	0	0	0
Independent Ex-Service	0	0	0	0
Total	81	27	81	27
Total	108		108	
Working majority	7	9	33	19
Working majority	16		52	

== Ward results ==
Attercliffe
Party	Candidate	Votes	%	±%
Labour	Harry Firth	2,798	87.7	+11.0
Conservative	Harold Mellor	391	12.2	−11.0
Majority		2,407	75.5	+22.0
Turnout		3,189		
Labour hold		Swing	+11.0	

Beauchief
Party	Candidate	Votes	%	±%
Conservative	Eric Crewe	4,353	71.8	−4.8
Labour	Terence Butler	1,705	28.1	+4.8
Majority		2,648	43.7	−9.6
Turnout		6,058		
Conservative hold		Swing	-4.8	

Birley
Party	Candidate	Votes	%	±%
Labour	John Marshall	4,269	71.3	+8.7
Conservative	Danny George	1,720	28.7	−8.7
Majority		2,549	42.5	+17.4
Turnout		5,989		
Labour gain from Conservative		Swing	+8.7	

Brightside
Party	Candidate	Votes	%	±%
Labour	George Wilson	3,132	83.0	+15.2
Conservative	Kathleen Moore	568	15.0	−14.7
Communist	Reg Arundal	72	1.9	−0.5
Majority		2,564	68.0	+30.0
Turnout		3,772		
Labour hold		Swing	+14.9	

Broomhill
Party	Candidate	Votes	%	±%
Conservative	Graham Cheetham	2,636	57.3	−12.9
Labour	Peter Price	1,560	33.9	+4.0
Liberal	John Isard	406	8.8	+8.8
Majority		1,076	23.4	−16.9
Turnout		4,602		
Conservative hold		Swing	-8.4	

Burngreave
Party	Candidate	Votes	%	±%
Labour	Charlotte Ellis	2,426	43.4	−7.2
Liberal	Malcolm Johnson	2,200	39.4	+11.9
Conservative	David Chapman	475	8.5	−12.5
Independent Labour	Michael Newton	433	7.7	+7.7
Communist	Roy Eccles	49	0.9	+0.0
Majority		226	4.0	−19.2
Turnout		5,583		
Labour gain from Conservative		Swing	-9.5	

Castle
Party	Candidate	Votes	%	±%
Labour	Marie Rodgers	2,541	84.0	+10.1
Liberal	Frank Mettam	355	11.7	+11.7
Communist	Edna Ashworth	129	4.2	+1.8
Majority		2,186	72.2	+22.1
Turnout		3,025		
Labour hold		Swing	-0.8	

Darnall
Party	Candidate	Votes	%	±%
Labour	John Cornwell	3,811	79.6	+10.6
Conservative	Michael Heath	976	20.4	−10.6
Majority		2,835	59.2	+21.2
Turnout		4,787		
Labour gain from Conservative		Swing	+10.6	

Dore
Party	Candidate	Votes	%	±%
Conservative	Pat Santhouse	3,744	63.3	−12.8
Labour	Edward Ferrett	1,802	30.5	+6.6
Liberal	Ben Thorpe	366	6.2	+6.2
Majority		1,942	32.8	−19.5
Turnout		5,912		
Conservative hold		Swing	-9.7	

Ecclesall
Party	Candidate	Votes	%	±%
Conservative	David Pinder	3,575	70.9	−8.9
Labour	Ivy Evison	1,244	24.7	+4.5
Independent Ex-Service	Geoffrey Widdison	220	4.4	+4.4
Majority		2,331	46.2	−13.4
Turnout		5,039		
Conservative hold		Swing	-6.7	

Firth Park
Party	Candidate	Votes	%	±%
Labour	John Morris	3,260	70.4	+7.5
Conservative	Madge Kerton	1,090	23.5	−11.8
Liberal	Cynthia Hepworth	188	4.0	+4.0
Communist	Barry Bracken	89	1.9	+0.2
Majority		2,170	46.9	+19.4
Turnout		4,627		
Labour gain from Conservative		Swing	+9.6	

Gleadless
Party	Candidate	Votes	%	±%
Labour	Roger Barton	5,062	59.8	+13.6
Conservative	Charles Davison	3,055	36.1	−10.0
Liberal	Dennis Boothroyd	339	4.0	−3.6
Majority		2,007	23.7	+23.6
Turnout		8,456		
Labour gain from Conservative		Swing	+11.8	

Hallam
Party	Candidate	Votes	%	±%
Conservative	Cliff Godber	3,146	58.3	−15.2
Labour	Philip Moscrop	1,792	33.2	+6.8
Liberal	Jean Mason	454	8.4	+8.4
Majority		1,354	25.1	−22.0
Turnout		5,392		
Conservative hold		Swing	-11.0	

Handsworth
Party	Candidate	Votes	%	±%
Labour	Annie Britton	3,522	78.7	+13.8
Conservative	Frank Brookes	953	21.3	−13.8
Majority		2,569	57.4	+27.6
Turnout		4,475		
Labour gain from Conservative		Swing	+13.8	

Heeley
Party	Candidate	Votes	%	±%
Labour	Alfred Mosforth	4,193	60.7	+9.0
Conservative	Rodger Outram	2,234	32.3	−13.7
Liberal	Michael Swain	293	4.2	+4.2
Communist	Martin Ashworth	183	2.6	+0.4
Majority		1,959	28.4	+22.7
Turnout		6,903		
Labour gain from Liberal		Swing	+11.3	

Hillsborough
Party	Candidate	Votes	%	±%
Labour	Alf Meade	3,354	53.1	+8.8
Conservative	Irvine Patnick	2,674	42.3	−13.4
Liberal	Martyn Atkinson	290	4.6	+4.6
Majority		680	10.7	−0.7
Turnout		6,318		
Labour gain from Conservative		Swing	+11.1	

Intake
Party	Candidate	Votes	%	±%
Labour	Mike Balty	3,887	66.7	+8.6
Conservative	Peter Hodson	1,638	28.1	−13.7
Liberal	Colin Andrews	299	5.1	+5.1
Majority		2,249	38.6	+22.4
Turnout		5,824		
Labour gain from Conservative		Swing	+11.1	

Manor
Party	Candidate	Votes	%	±%
Labour	George Machin	3,168	85.4	+8.5
Conservative	Peter Huddart	384	10.3	−10.7
Communist	John Hukin	155	4.2	+2.2
Majority		2,784	75.1	+19.3
Turnout		3,707		
Labour hold		Swing	+9.2	

Mosborough
Party	Candidate	Votes	%	±%
Labour	Harry Havenhand	2,592	81.1	+16.3
Conservative	Stan Titterington	605	18.9	−8.6
Majority		1,987	62.1	+24.9
Turnout		3,197		
Labour hold		Swing	+12.4	

Nether Edge
Party	Candidate	Votes	%	±%
Conservative	Lionel Farris	2,829	64.8	−7.1
Labour	Adam Pemberton	1,537	35.2	+9.6
Majority		1,292	29.6	−16.8
Turnout		4,366		
Conservative hold		Swing	-8.3	

Nether Shire
Party	Candidate	Votes	%	±%
Labour	Tom Ratcliffe	3,428	80.9	+15.2
Conservative	Bryan Dick	649	15.3	−10.4
Communist	Ken Hattersley	162	3.8	+1.5
Majority		2,779	65.5	+25.7
Turnout		4,239		
Labour hold		Swing	+12.8	

Netherthorpe
Party	Candidate	Votes	%	±%
Labour	Thomas Woodhead	2,566	74.0	+6.7
Conservative	Jean Grindrod	837	24.1	−8.5
Communist	Violet Gill	65	1.9	+1.9
Majority		1,729	49.8	+15.2
Turnout		3,468		
Labour gain from Conservative		Swing	+7.6	

Owlerton
Party	Candidate	Votes	%	±%
Labour	Mary Kirk	3,506	81.6	+13.7
Conservative	Patrick Fenoughty	792	18.4	−13.7
Majority		2,714	63.2	+27.4
Turnout		4,298		
Labour gain from Conservative		Swing	+13.7	

Park
Party	Candidate	Votes	%	±%
Labour	Philip Grisdale	3,948	86.7	+9.3
Conservative	Roger Wright	489	10.7	−9.4
Communist	George Matthews	116	2.5	+0.2
Majority		3,459	76.0	+18.7
Turnout		4,553		
Labour hold		Swing	+9.3	

Sharrow
Party	Candidate	Votes	%	±%
Labour	John Baxter	2,756	70.6	+10.2
Conservative	Colin Barnsley	987	25.3	−14.3
Liberal	Colin Wood	161	4.1	+4.1
Majority		1,769	45.3	+24.5
Turnout		3,904		
Labour gain from Conservative		Swing	+12.2	

Southey Green
Party	Candidate	Votes	%	±%
Labour	Francis O'Shaughnessy	3,062	87.4	+7.5
Conservative	Kenneth Whitehouse	352	10.0	−6.8
Communist	Ray Chambers	89	2.5	−0.7
Majority		2,710	77.4	+14.3
Turnout		3,503		
Labour hold		Swing	+7.1	

Walkley
Party	Candidate	Votes	%	±%
Labour	Veronica Hardstaff	2,957	68.2	+12.9
Conservative	Stan Parnell	1,376	31.8	−12.9
Majority		1,581	36.5	+25.8
Turnout		4,333		
Labour gain from Conservative		Swing	+12.9	
