= 1975 Sheffield City Council election =

| ← 1973 | 1 May 1975 | 1976 → |

33 of 90 seats to Sheffield City Council 46 seats needed for a majority
| | First party | Second party | Third party |
|---|---|---|---|
| Party | Labour | Conservative | Liberal |
| Seats won | 23 | 8 | 2 |
| Seat change | ▼3 | ▲2 | ▲1 |
Majority party before election
Labour Party (UK)
Majority party after election
Labour Party (UK)

Elections to Sheffield City Council were held on 1 May 1975. One third of the council was up for election.

== Election result ==
Sheffield local election result 1975
| Party | Seats | Gains | Losses | Net gain/loss | Seats % | Votes % | Votes | +/− |
|---|---|---|---|---|---|---|---|---|
| Labour | 23 | 0 | 3 | -3 | 69.7 | 45.1 | 49,048 | -9.8 |
| Conservative | 8 | 2 | 0 | +2 | 24.2 | 41.2 | 44,792 | +12.5 |
| Liberal | 2 | 1 | 0 | +1 | 6.0 | 13.0 | 14,157 | +0.4 |
| Communist | 0 | 0 | 0 | 0 | 0 | 0.6 | 655 | -0.7 |

This result had the following consequences for the total number of seats on the Council after the elections:

| Party | Previous council | New council |
|---|---|---|
| Labour | 69 | 66 |
| Conservatives | 18 | 20 |
| Liberals | 3 | 4 |
| Communist | 0 | 0 |
| Total | 90 | 90 |
| Working majority | 48 | 42 |

== Ward results ==
Attercliffe
| Party | Candidate | Votes | % | ±% |
|---|---|---|---|---|
| Labour | James Pearson* | 1,227 | 74.0 | −10.9 |
| Labour | Daphne Billings | 1,166 | | |
| Conservative | Margaret Broomhead | 430 | 25.9 | +10.8 |
| Conservative | Evelyn Millward | 410 | | |
| Majority | | 736 | 48.1 | −21.7 |
| Turnout | | 3,233 | | |
| Labour hold | | Swing | -10.8 | |

Beauchief
| Party | Candidate | Votes | % | ±% |
|---|---|---|---|---|
| Conservative | Clifford Godber* | 4,376 | 71.8 | +17.9 |
| Labour | Colin Radcliffe | 1,016 | 16.7 | −2.9 |
| Liberal | Colin Wood | 699 | 11.5 | −15.0 |
| Majority | | 3,360 | 55.1 | +27.7 |
| Turnout | | 6,091 | | |
| Conservative hold | | Swing | +10.4 | |

Birley
| Party | Candidate | Votes | % | ±% |
|---|---|---|---|---|
| Labour | George Fisher* | 2,162 | 56.4 | −14.7 |
| Conservative | Gordon Millward | 1,560 | 40.7 | +11.9 |
| Communist | Roy Capps | 112 | 2.9 | +2.9 |
| Majority | | 602 | 15.7 | −26.6 |
| Turnout | | 3,834 | | |
| Labour hold | | Swing | -13.3 | |

Brightside
| Party | Candidate | Votes | % | ±% |
|---|---|---|---|---|
| Labour | Peter Price* | 1,693 | 64.4 | −19.0 |
| Conservative | Nicholas Williams | 603 | 22.9 | +9.8 |
| Liberal | Janet Jenkinson | 331 | 12.6 | +12.6 |
| Majority | | 1,090 | 41.5 | −28.8 |
| Turnout | | 2,627 | | |
| Labour hold | | Swing | -14.4 | |

Broomhill
| Party | Candidate | Votes | % | ±% |
|---|---|---|---|---|
| Conservative | Marvyn Moore* | 2,678 | 58.3 | +11.5 |
| Labour | David Brown | 1,033 | 22.5 | −3.1 |
| Liberal | John Isard | 880 | 19.1 | −8.4 |
| Majority | | 1,645 | 35.8 | +16.5 |
| Turnout | | 4,591 | | |
| Conservative hold | | Swing | +7.3 | |

Burngreave
| Party | Candidate | Votes | % | ±% |
|---|---|---|---|---|
| Liberal | Donald Sparkes* | 2,320 | 50.1 | −13.4 |
| Labour | Clive Betts | 2,069 | 44.7 | +12.9 |
| Conservative | Emma Sizer | 199 | 4.3 | −0.3 |
| Communist | Alvin Jenkinson | 42 | 0.9 | +0.9 |
| Majority | | 251 | 5.4 | −26.3 |
| Turnout | | 4,630 | | |
| Liberal hold | | Swing | -13.1 | |

Castle
| Party | Candidate | Votes | % | ±% |
|---|---|---|---|---|
| Labour | Roy Munn* | 1,312 | 64.4 | −15.0 |
| Conservative | Alice Burrows | 439 | 21.5 | +5.7 |
| Liberal | Jacqueline Butler | 234 | 11.5 | +11.5 |
| Communist | Kenneth Randall | 52 | 2.5 | −2.2 |
| Majority | | 873 | 42.9 | −20.7 |
| Turnout | | 2,037 | | |
| Labour hold | | Swing | -10.3 | |

Chapel Green
| Party | Candidate | Votes | % | ±% |
|---|---|---|---|---|
| Liberal | Graham North | 2,282 | 48.2 | +20.3 |
| Labour | Lawrence Kingham* | 1,559 | 32.9 | −4.7 |
| Conservative | Phillip Baker | 895 | 18.9 | +18.9 |
| Majority | | 723 | 15.3 | +9.3 |
| Turnout | | 4,736 | | |
| Liberal gain from Labour | | Swing | +11.5 | |

Darnall
| Party | Candidate | Votes | % | ±% |
|---|---|---|---|---|
| Labour | Isidore Lewis* | 1,695 | 58.7 | −18.4 |
| Conservative | Shirley Rhodes | 1,194 | 41.3 | +18.4 |
| Majority | | 501 | 17.4 | −36.8 |
| Turnout | | 2,889 | | |
| Labour hold | | Swing | -18.4 | |

Dore
| Party | Candidate | Votes | % | ±% |
|---|---|---|---|---|
| Conservative | Pat Santhouse* | 3,968 | 79.6 | +9.9 |
| Labour | Leon Harris | 1,016 | 20.4 | −9.9 |
| Majority | | 2,952 | 59.2 | +19.8 |
| Turnout | | 4,984 | | |
| Conservative hold | | Swing | +9.9 | |

Ecclesall
| Party | Candidate | Votes | % | ±% |
|---|---|---|---|---|
| Conservative | Edith Edeson* | 3,436 | 68.8 | −4.4 |
| Liberal | Patrick Smith | 814 | 16.3 | +16.3 |
| Labour | Les Bland | 740 | 14.8 | −12.0 |
| Majority | | 2,622 | 52.5 | +6.1 |
| Turnout | | 4,990 | | |
| Conservative hold | | Swing | -10.3 | |

Firth Park
| Party | Candidate | Votes | % | ±% |
|---|---|---|---|---|
| Labour | Terence Butler* | 1,948 | 56.8 | +0.8 |
| Conservative | John Chandler | 827 | 24.1 | +14.2 |
| Liberal | Albert Hattersley | 652 | 19.0 | −13.0 |
| Majority | | 1,121 | 32.7 | +8.6 |
| Turnout | | 3,427 | | |
| Labour hold | | Swing | -6.7 | |

Gleadless
| Party | Candidate | Votes | % | ±% |
|---|---|---|---|---|
| Labour | Gerald Berminham | 2,523 | 48.4 | −13.1 |
| Conservative | Jack Thompson | 2,237 | 42.9 | +4.5 |
| Liberal | Robert Mumford | 447 | 8.6 | +8.6 |
| Majority | | 386 | 5.5 | −17.6 |
| Turnout | | 5,207 | | |
| Labour hold | | Swing | -8.8 | |

Hallam
| Party | Candidate | Votes | % | ±% |
|---|---|---|---|---|
| Conservative | Kenneth Arnold* | 3,376 | 64.2 | +13.1 |
| Labour | Veronica South | 1,065 | 20.2 | −7.5 |
| Liberal | Keith Jackson | 815 | 15.5 | −5.7 |
| Majority | | 2,311 | 44.0 | +20.6 |
| Turnout | | 5,256 | | |
| Conservative hold | | Swing | +10.3 | |

Handsworth
| Party | Candidate | Votes | % | ±% |
|---|---|---|---|---|
| Labour | Annie Britton* | 2,074 | 59.9 | −16.3 |
| Conservative | Keith Fessey | 1,106 | 31.9 | +8.2 |
| Liberal | Alfred Sellars | 283 | 8.2 | +8.2 |
| Majority | | 968 | 28.0 | −24.5 |
| Turnout | | 3,463 | | |
| Labour hold | | Swing | -12.2 | |

Heeley
| Party | Candidate | Votes | % | ±% |
|---|---|---|---|---|
| Labour | John Senior* | 2,472 | 51.6 | −9.3 |
| Conservative | Francis Brookes | 1,811 | 37.8 | +13.6 |
| Liberal | Bob Jackson | 505 | 10.5 | −0.9 |
| Majority | | 661 | 13.8 | −22.9 |
| Turnout | | 4,788 | | |
| Labour hold | | Swing | -11.4 | |

Hillsborough
| Party | Candidate | Votes | % | ±% |
|---|---|---|---|---|
| Conservative | Merelina Fox | 2,249 | 47.1 | +5.5 |
| Labour | Geoff Fairbrother* | 2,078 | 43.5 | −14.8 |
| Liberal | Fleur Woolley | 446 | 9.3 | +9.3 |
| Majority | | 171 | 3.6 | −13.1 |
| Turnout | | 4,773 | | |
| Conservative gain from Labour | | Swing | +10.1 | |

Intake
| Party | Candidate | Votes | % | ±% |
|---|---|---|---|---|
| Labour | Joseph Thomas** | 2,127 | 46.7 | −13.0 |
| Labour | Thomas Woodhead* | 2,020 | | |
| Conservative | Anthony Parkin | 1,400 | 30.7 | +7.6 |
| Liberal | Alan Thompson | 1,026 | 22.5 | +5.4 |
| Liberal | David Winn | 728 | | |
| Majority | | 620 | 16.0 | −20.6 |
| Turnout | | 7,301 | | |
| Labour hold | | Swing | | |
| Labour hold | | Swing | -10.3 | |

Joseph Thomas was a sitting councillor for Gleadless ward

Manor
| Party | Candidate | Votes | % | ±% |
|---|---|---|---|---|
| Labour | Marie Rodgers* | 1,778 | 74.5 | −9.9 |
| Conservative | Roger Barnsley | 340 | 14.2 | +4.0 |
| Liberal | Joan Gould | 178 | 7.4 | +7.4 |
| Communist | John Hukin | 91 | 3.8 | −1.5 |
| Majority | | 1,438 | 60.3 | +16.3 |
| Turnout | | 2,387 | | |
| Labour hold | | Swing | +8.1 | |

Mosborough
| Party | Candidate | Votes | % | ±% |
|---|---|---|---|---|
| Labour | Harry Havenhand* | 1,421 | 63.8 | −14.1 |
| Conservative | Arnold Snowden | 804 | 36.1 | +14.0 |
| Majority | | 617 | 27.7 | −28.1 |
| Turnout | | 2,225 | | |
| Labour hold | | Swing | -14.0 | |

Nether Edge
| Party | Candidate | Votes | % | ±% |
|---|---|---|---|---|
| Conservative | Constance Dodson* | 2,257 | 58.2 | +8.8 |
| Labour | Frank Sidebottom | 861 | 22.2 | −7.8 |
| Liberal | Brian Chippendale | 760 | 19.6 | −0.9 |
| Majority | | 1,396 | 36.0 | +16.6 |
| Turnout | | 3,878 | | |
| Conservative hold | | Swing | +8.3 | |

Nether Shire
| Party | Candidate | Votes | % | ±% |
|---|---|---|---|---|
| Labour | Philip Moscrop* | 1,840 | 67.3 | −11.1 |
| Conservative | Richard Clarke | 792 | 28.9 | +13.2 |
| Communist | Kenneth Hattersley | 103 | 3.7 | −2.1 |
| Majority | | 1,048 | 38.4 | −24.3 |
| Turnout | | 2,735 | | |
| Labour hold | | Swing | -12.1 | |

Netherthorpe
| Party | Candidate | Votes | % | ±% |
|---|---|---|---|---|
| Labour | Enid Hattersley* | 1,557 | 62.3 | −9.0 |
| Conservative | Moira Hattersley | 676 | 27.0 | +2.2 |
| Liberal | Susan Bowns | 267 | 10.7 | +10.7 |
| Majority | | 881 | 35.3 | −11.2 |
| Turnout | | 2,500 | | |
| Labour hold | | Swing | -5.6 | |

Owlerton
| Party | Candidate | Votes | % | ±% |
|---|---|---|---|---|
| Labour | Henry Hanwell* | 707 | 48.4 | −35.5 |
| Conservative | Andrew Bannister | 538 | 36.9 | +20.9 |
| Liberal | Ronald Nears | 214 | 14.6 | +14.6 |
| Majority | | 169 | 11.5 | −56.4 |
| Turnout | | 1,459 | | |
| Labour hold | | Swing | -28.2 | |

Park
| Party | Candidate | Votes | % | ±% |
|---|---|---|---|---|
| Labour | Phillip Grisdale* | 2,053 | 69.2 | −12.7 |
| Conservative | Nicholas Hutton | 512 | 17.2 | +5.8 |
| Liberal | Richard Bradley | 314 | 10.6 | +10.6 |
| Communist | Gordon Ashberry | 89 | 3.0 | −3.7 |
| Majority | | 1,541 | 52.0 | −18.5 |
| Turnout | | 2,968 | | |
| Labour hold | | Swing | -9.2 | |

Sharrow
| Party | Candidate | Votes | % | ±% |
|---|---|---|---|---|
| Labour | Alfred Wood* | 1,391 | 54.1 | −19.1 |
| Conservative | Colin Barnsley | 732 | 28.5 | +1.8 |
| Liberal | Michael Ellis | 354 | 13.7 | +13.7 |
| Communist | Neville Taylor | 94 | 3.6 | +3.6 |
| Majority | | 659 | 25.6 | −20.9 |
| Turnout | | 2,571 | | |
| Labour hold | | Swing | -10.4 | |

South Wortley
| Party | Candidate | Votes | % | ±% |
|---|---|---|---|---|
| Conservative | Richard Saddington | 2,430 | 52.2 | +29.2 |
| Labour | John Laurent* | 2,219 | 47.7 | +8.1 |
| Majority | | 211 | 4.5 | −15.4 |
| Turnout | | 4,649 | | |
| Conservative gain from Labour | | Swing | +12.2 | |

Southey Green
| Party | Candidate | Votes | % | ±% |
|---|---|---|---|---|
| Labour | Dorothy Podlesny* | 1,687 | 76.7 | −10.6 |
| Conservative | Kevin Moore | 441 | 20.0 | +10.5 |
| Communist | Violet Gill | 72 | 3.3 | +0.1 |
| Majority | | 1,246 | 56.7 | −21.1 |
| Turnout | | 2,200 | | |
| Labour hold | | Swing | -10.5 | |

Stocksbridge
| Party | Candidate | Votes | % | ±% |
|---|---|---|---|---|
| Labour | Paul Wood* | 2,211 | 61.8 | +20.0 |
| Conservative | Stuart Dawson | 1,365 | 38.2 | +9.9 |
| Majority | | 846 | 23.6 | +11.6 |
| Turnout | | 3,576 | | |
| Labour hold | | Swing | +5.0 | |

Walkley
| Party | Candidate | Votes | % | ±% |
|---|---|---|---|---|
| Labour | Bill Owen* | 1,514 | 50.9 | −22.2 |
| Labour | Alan Billings | 1,512 | | |
| Conservative | Elizabeth Hutton | 1,121 | 37.7 | +10.8 |
| Conservative | Caroline Viner | 1,009 | | |
| Liberal | Edward Harrison | 336 | 11.3 | +11.3 |
| Majority | | 391 | 16.3 | −29.9 |
| Turnout | | 5,492 | | |
| Labour hold | | Swing | | |
| Labour hold | | Swing | -16.5 | |
